

Deaths in December

28: James Owen Sullivan
24: George Michael
17: Chris Henry

Current sporting seasons

American football 2009

NFL
NCAA Division I FBS

Auto racing 2009

Sprint Cup begins Feb 14
Chase
IRL IndyCar Series begins Mar 14
World Rally Championship begins Feb 14
Formula Two begins Apr 17
Nationwide Series begins Feb 13
Camping World Truck Series begins Feb 12
GP2 Series begins May 8
GP3 Series
WTTC begins Mar 7
V8 Supercar begins Feb 18
American Le Mans begins Mar 20
Le Mans Series
A1 Grand Prix begin Feb 28-->
GP2 Asia Series

Superleague Formula begin Apr 4
Rolex Sports Car Series begins Jan 30
FIA GT1 World Championship begins Apr 3
FIA GT2 European Championship begins Apr 3
Formula Three
World Series by Renault begins Apr 17
Deutsche Tourenwagen Masters
Super GT-->

Major League Baseball -->
Nippon Professional Baseball-->

Basketball 2009

NBA
NCAA Division I men
NCAA Division I women
Euroleague
Eurocup
EuroChallenge
ASEAN Basketball League
Australia
France
Germany
Greece
Iran
Israel
Italy
Philippines
Philippine Cup
Russia
Spain
Turkey

Cricket 2009–2010

Australia:
Sheffield Shield
Ford Ranger Cup

Bangladesh:
National League

India:
Ranji Trophy

New Zealand:
Plunket Shield
Pakistan:
Quaid-i-Azam Trophy
South Africa:
SuperSport Series
Sri Lanka:
Premier Trophy

Zimbabwe:
Logan Cup

Football (soccer) 2009

National teams competitions
2011 FIFA Women's World Cup qualification (UEFA)
2011 AFC Asian Cup qualification

International clubs competitions
UEFA (Europe) Champions League
Europa League
UEFA Women's Champions League

CONCACAF (North & Central America) Champions League
OFC (Oceania) Champions League
Domestic (national) competitions

Australia

England
France
Germany
Iran
Italy

Scotland
Spain

Golf 2010

European Tour

Ice hockey 2009

National Hockey League

Rugby union 2009

Heineken Cup
European Challenge Cup
English Premiership
Celtic League
LV Cup
Top 14

Winter sports

Alpine Skiing World Cup
Biathlon World Cup
Bobsleigh World Cup
Cross-Country Skiing World Cup

Freestyle Skiing World Cup
Luge World Cup
Nordic Combined World Cup

Skeleton World Cup
Ski Jumping World Cup
Snowboarding World Cup
Speed Skating World Cup

Days of the month

December 31, 2009 (Thursday)

American football
NCAA bowl games:
Bell Helicopters Armed Forces Bowl in Fort Worth:
Air Force 47, Houston 20
Brut Sun Bowl in El Paso:
Oklahoma 31, (21) Stanford 27
Texas Bowl in Houston:
Navy 35, Missouri 13
Insight Bowl in Tempe:
Iowa State 14, Minnesota 13
Chick-fil-A Bowl in Atlanta:
(11) Virginia Tech 37, Tennessee 14

Ice hockey
World Junior Championships in Saskatchewan, Canada: (teams in bold advance to the semifinals, teams in italics secure quarterfinals berths, teams in strike go to relegation round)
Group A in Saskatoon:
 4–1 
 4–5 (SO) 
Canada rally from 2 goals down with 10 minutes remaining to tie the score in regulation time and then win the shootout 3–2.
Final standings: Canada 11 points, USA 10, Switzerland 6, Slovakia 3, Latvia 0.
Group B in Regina:
 7–1 
 5–2 
Final standings: Sweden 12 points, Russia 9, Finland 6, Czech Republic 3, Austria 0.
Spengler Cup Final in Davos, Switzerland:
HC Dinamo Minsk  3–1  HC Davos

December 30, 2009 (Wednesday)

American football
NCAA bowl games:
Roady's Humanitarian Bowl in Boise:
Idaho 43, Bowling Green 42
Pacific Life Holiday Bowl in San Diego:
(22) Nebraska 33, (20) Arizona 0

Cricket
England in South Africa:
2nd Test in Durban, day 5:
 343 and 133;  574/9d. England win by an innings and 98 runs, lead the 4-match series 1–0.
Pakistan in Australia:
1st Test in Melbourne, day 5:
 454/5d and 225/8d;  258 and 251. Australia win by 170 runs, lead the 3-match series 1–0.

Ice hockey
World Junior Championships in Saskatchewan, Canada: (teams in italics secure quarterfinals berths, teams in strike go to relegation round)
Group A in Saskatoon:
 7–5 
Standings: Canada, USA 9 points (3 games), Slovakia, Switzerland 3 (3), Latvia 0 (4).
Group B in Regina:
 10–1 
Standings: Sweden 9 points (3 games), Russia, Finland 6 (3), Czech Republic 3 (3), Austria 0 (4).

December 29, 2009 (Tuesday)

Alpine skiing
Men's World Cup in Bormio, Italy:
Downhill:  Andrej Jerman   Didier Defago   Michael Walchhofer 
Overall standings (after 15 of 34 races): (1) Carlo Janka  575 points (2) Benjamin Raich  565 (3) Didier Cuche  476
Downhill standings (after 4 of 8 races): (1) Cuche 251 points (2) Walchhofer 200 (3) Janka 184
Women's World Cup in Lienz, Austria:
Slalom:  Marlies Schild   Sandrine Aubert   Kathrin Zettel 
Overall standings (after 13 of 33 races): (1) Lindsey Vonn  594 points (2) Maria Riesch  549 (3) Zettel 489
Slalom standings (after 4 of 8 races): (1)  Riesch 243 points (2) Schild 220 (3) Aubert 216

American football
NCAA bowl games:
EagleBank Bowl in Washington
UCLA 30, Temple 21
Champs Sports Bowl in Orlando
(25) Wisconsin 20, (15) Miami (FL) 14

Cricket
England in South Africa:
2nd Test in Durban, day 4:
 343 & 76/6 (32.0 ov);  575/9d (Ian Bell 141). South Africa trail by 156 runs with 4 wickets remaining.
Pakistan in Australia:
1st Test in Melbourne, day 4:
 454/5d and 225/8d (Shane Watson 120*, Mohammad Aamer 5/79);  258 and 170/3. Pakistan require another 252 runs with 7 wickets remaining.
Watson scores his maiden Test century and Australia's first hundred this summer, while Aamer becomes the youngest fast bowler in history to claim five-wickets in an innings.

Ice hockey
World Junior Championships in Saskatchewan, Canada: (teams in italics secure quarterfinals berths)
Group A in Saskatoon:
 1–12 
 8–2 
Standings: Canada, USA 9 points (3 games), Slovakia 3 (3), Switzerland 0 (2), Latvia 0 (3).
Group B in Regina:
 1–7 
 4–1 
Standings: Sweden 9 points (3 games), Russia 6 (3), Finland 3 (2), Czech Republic 3 (3), Austria 0 (3).

Ski jumping
Four Hills Tournament:
World Cup in Oberstdorf, Germany:
HS 137:  Andreas Kofler  265.2 points (125.0 m/134.0 m)  Janne Ahonen  253.3 (116.5 m/137.0 m)  Thomas Morgenstern  250.3 (124.5 m/126.5 m)
World Cup standings (after 7 of 23 events): (1) Simon Ammann  469 points (2) Gregor Schlierenzauer  411 (3) Kofler 379

December 28, 2009 (Monday)

Alpine skiing
Women's World Cup in Lienz, Austria:
Giant slalom:  Kathrin Hölzl  2:16.61  Manuela Mölgg  2:16.66  Taïna Barioz  2:16.72
Overall standings (after 12 of 33 races): (1) Lindsey Vonn  581 points (2) Maria Riesch  531 (3) Kathrin Zettel  429
Giant slalom standings (after 4 of 7 races): (1) Hölzl 281 points (2) Zettel 265 (3) Tina Maze  202

American football
NFL Monday Night Football, Week 16 (division champion in bold):
Chicago Bears 36, Minnesota Vikings 30 (OT)
The Vikings' loss gives the New Orleans Saints home advantage throughout the NFC playoffs.
NCAA bowl games:
Advocare V100 Independence Bowl in Shreveport:
Georgia 44, Texas A&M 20

Cricket
England in South Africa:
2nd Test in Durban, day 3:
 343; England 386/5 (123.0 ov, Alastair Cook 118). England led by 43 runs with 5 wickets remaining in the 1st innings.
Pakistan in Australia:
1st Test in Melbourne, day 3:
 454/5d & 111/3 (34.0 ov);  258. Australia led by 307 runs with 7 wickets remaining.

Ice hockey
World Junior Championships in Saskatchewan, Canada:
Group A in Saskatoon:
 6–0 
Standings (after 2 games): Canada, USA 6 points, Slovakia 3, Switzerland, Latvia 0.
Group B in Regina:
 0–2 
Standings (after 2 games): Sweden, Russia 6 points, Finland 3, Austria, Czech Republic 0.

December 27, 2009 (Sunday)

American football
NFL Week 16 (division champions in bold, teams assured of playoff berths in italics):
Atlanta Falcons 31, Buffalo Bills 3
Cincinnati Bengals 17, Kansas City Chiefs 10
Five days after the Bengals attended the funeral of their teammate Chris Henry, they clinch the AFC North.
Cleveland Browns 23, Oakland Raiders 9
 The Raiders' Sebastian Janikowski makes a 61-yard field goal at the end of the first half, becoming the fourth kicker in NFL history to connect from 60-plus yards.
Green Bay Packers 48, Seattle Seahawks 10
Houston Texans 27, Miami Dolphins 20
New England Patriots 35, Jacksonville Jaguars 7
The Pats clinch the AFC East title.
Tampa Bay Buccaneers 20, New Orleans Saints 17 (OT)
Carolina Panthers 41, New York Giants 9
The Panthers rout the Giants in their last game at Giants Stadium. The Jets will close out Giants Stadium next week when they host the Bengals.
Pittsburgh Steelers 23, Baltimore Ravens 20
San Francisco 49ers 20, Detroit Lions 6
Arizona Cardinals 31, St. Louis Rams 10
New York Jets 29, Indianapolis Colts 15
The Colts' record regular-season winning streak ends after 23 games. Peyton Manning becomes the fourth quarterback in NFL history with 50,000 career passing yards.
Philadelphia Eagles 30, Denver Broncos 27
Sunday Night Football: Dallas Cowboys 17, Washington Redskins 0
 The Cowboys' win gives them the last playoff berth in the NFC and sets up a home showdown with the Eagles for the NFC East title next week.
NCAA bowl games:
Gaylord Hotels Music City Bowl in Nashville
Clemson 21, Kentucky 13

Cricket
England in South Africa:
2nd Test in Durban, day 2:
 343;  103/1 (26.2 ov). England trail by 240 runs with 9 wickets remaining in the 1st innings.
Pakistan in Australia:
1st Test in Melbourne, day 2:
 454/5d;  109/4. Pakistan trail by 345 runs with 6 wickets remaining in the 1st innings.
Sri Lanka in India:
5th ODI in New Delhi:
 83/5 (23.3 ov). No result. India win the 5-match series 3–1.

Ice hockey
World Junior Championships in Saskatchewan, Canada:
Group A in Saskatoon:
 3–0 
 8–3 
Standings: USA 6 points (2 matches), Canada 3 (1), Slovakia 3 (2), Switzerland 0 (1), Latvia 0 (2).
Group B in Regina:
 3–7 
 3–4 
The Finns rally from 3-goal deficit with less than 3 minutes left in the second period.
Standings: Sweden 6 points (2 games), Russia, Finland 3 (1), Austria, Czech Republic 0 (2).

December 26, 2009 (Saturday)

American football
NCAA bowl games:
Little Caesars Pizza Bowl in Detroit:
Marshall 21, Ohio 17
Meineke Car Care Bowl in Charlotte:
(17) Pittsburgh 19, UNC 17
Emerald Bowl in San Francisco:
(24) USC 24, Boston College 13

Cricket
England in South Africa:
2nd Test in Durban, day 1:
 175/5 (61.0 ov)
Pakistan in Australia:
1st Test in Melbourne, day 1:
 305/3 (90.0 ov)
The string of century near-misses continue with Shane Watson dismissed at 93 and Simon Katich at 98, following his 99 in the previous match.

Ice hockey
World Junior Championships in Saskatchewan, Canada:
Group A in Saskatoon:
 0–16 
 3–7 
Group B in Regina:
 1–10 
 6–2

December 25, 2009 (Friday)

American football
NFL Week 16: (team in bold clinches division title)
San Diego Chargers 42, Tennessee Titans 17
The Chargers win their tenth straight game and secure a first-round bye in the AFC playoffs.

Basketball
NBA Christmas Day games:
Miami Heat 93, New York Knicks 87
Boston Celtics 86, Orlando Magic 77
Cleveland Cavaliers 102, Los Angeles Lakers 87
Phoenix Suns 124, Los Angeles Clippers 93
Portland Trail Blazers 107, Denver Nuggets 96

December 24, 2009 (Thursday)

American football
NCAA bowl games:
Sheraton Hawai Bowl in Honolulu:
SMU 45, Nevada 10
 The Mustangs easily win their first bowl appearance since the program was shut down by the NCAA in 1987 due to massive violations of NCAA rules.

Cricket
Sri Lanka in India:
4th ODI in Kolkata:
 315/6 (50 overs, Upul Tharanga 118);  317/3 (48.1 overs, Gautam Gambhir 150*, Virat Kohli 107). India win by 7 wickets, lead the 5-match series 3–1.

December 23, 2009 (Wednesday)

American football
NCAA bowl games:
SDCCU Poinsettia Bowl in San Diego:
(23) Utah 37, Cal 27
 The Utes win their ninth straight bowl appearance, tying USC for second on the all-time list behind Florida State's 11.

Auto racing
Formula One news:
Seven-time champion Michael Schumacher announces he will come back from retirement and drive for Mercedes Grand Prix team in 2010 season. BBC

December 22, 2009 (Tuesday)

American football
NCAA bowl games:
Maaco Bowl Las Vegas in Las Vegas:
(14) BYU 44, (18) Oregon State 20

Freestyle skiing
World Cup in Innichen/San Candido, Italy:
Men's skicross:  Michael Schmid   Audun Groenvold   Conradign Netzer 
Standings after 2 of 12 events: (1) Schmid 200 points (2) Groenvold 130 (3) Xavier Kuhn  125
Women's skicross:  Anna Holmlund   Ophelie David   Sanna Lüdi 
Standings after 2 of 12 events: (1) Holmund 200 points (2) David 140 (3) Ashleigh McIvor  125

December 21, 2009 (Monday)

Alpine skiing
Men's World Cup in Alta Badia, Italy:
Slalom:  Reinfried Herbst  1:49.31  Silvan Zurbriggen  1:49.39  Manfred Pranger  1:49.48
Overall standings after 14 of 34 races: (1) Benjamin Raich  565 points (2) Carlo Janka  553 (3) Aksel Lund Svindal  443
Slalom standings after 2 of 9 races: (1) Herbst 200 points (2) Zurbriggen 102 (3) Pranger 89

American football
NFL Monday Night Football, Week 15:
New York Giants 45, Washington Redskins 12

Basketball
College basketball news:
Kentucky defeats Drexel 88–44, making the Wildcats the first  NCAA Division I men's team with 2,000 all-time wins. (AP via ESPN)
NBA:
The Sacramento Kings make the biggest comeback in 13 years as they rally from a 35-points deficit with 8:50 remaining in the third quarter to beat the Chicago Bulls 102–98.

Cricket
Sri Lanka in India:
3rd ODI in Cuttack:
 239 (44.2 overs);  242/3 (42.4 overs). India win by 7 wickets, lead the 5-match series 2–1.

Freestyle skiing
World Cup in Innichen/San Candido, Italy:
Men's skicross:  Michael Schmid   Xavier Kuhn   Casey Puckett 
Women's skicross:  Anna Holmlund   Ashleigh McIvor   Ophélie David

Ice hockey
 New Jersey Devils goaltender Martin Brodeur sets a new NHL record for career shutouts with 104 as the Devils defeat the Pittsburgh Penguins 4–0 in Pittsburgh. (AP via ESPN)

December 20, 2009 (Sunday)

Alpine skiing
Men's World Cup in Alta Badia, Italy:
Giant slalom:  Massimiliano Blardone  2:35.76  Davide Simoncelli  2:36.19  Cyprien Richard  2:37.39
Overall standings (after 13 of 34 races): (1) Benjamin Raich  565 points (2) Carlo Janka  553 (3) Didier Cuche  436
Giant slalom standings (after 4 of 7 races): (1) Raich 235 points (2) Blardone 230 (3) Ted Ligety  192
Women's World Cup in Val d'Isère, France:
Super-G:  Fränzi Aufdenblatten  1:26.43  Nadia Styger  1:26.66  Lindsey Vonn  1:26.69
Overall standings (after 11 of 32 races): (1) Vonn 581 points (2) Maria Riesch  531 (3) Kathrin Zettel  384
Super-G standings (after 2 of 7 races): (1) Vonn 140 points (2) Elisabeth Görgl  124 (3) Styger 116

American football
NFL Week 15 (division champions in bold, teams assured of playoff berths in italics):
New England Patriots 17, Buffalo Bills 10
Houston Texans 16, St. Louis Rams 13
Atlanta Falcons 10, New York Jets 7
Arizona Cardinals 31, Detroit Lions 24
Tennessee Titans 27, Miami Dolphins 24 (OT)
Cleveland Browns 41, Kansas City Chiefs 34
Tampa Bay Buccaneers 24, Seattle Seahawks 7
Baltimore Ravens 31, Chicago Bears 7
Oakland Raiders 20, Denver Broncos 19
San Diego Chargers 27, Cincinnati Bengals 24
The Chargers win their ninth straight game.
Philadelphia Eagles 27, San Francisco 49ers 13
Pittsburgh Steelers 37, Green Bay Packers 36
Ben Roethlisberger connects with Mike Wallace for the tying touchdown on the game's final play, with Jeff Reed's extra point winning the game. The winning play also makes Roethlisberger the 10th quarterback in history to throw for 500 yards in a game.
Sunday Night Football: Carolina Panthers 26, Minnesota Vikings 7
NCAA bowl games:
New Orleans Bowl in New Orleans: Middle Tennessee 42, Southern Miss 32

Biathlon
World Cup 3 in Pokljuka, Slovenia:
10 km pursuit women:  Svetlana Sleptsova  34:03.2 (2 penalty loops)  Magdalena Neuner  34:39.5 (3)  Anna Bogaliy-Titovets  34:46.4 (2)
Overall standings after 7 of 25 events: (1) Helena Jonsson  342 points (2) Anna Carin Olofsson-Zidek  298 (3) Sleptsova 272
Pursuit standings after 2 of 6 events: (1) Sleptsova 114 points (2) Jonsson 96 (3) Andrea Henkel   69
12.5 km pursuit men:  Evgeny Ustyugov  34:50.9 (2 penalty loops)  Roland Lessing  35:00.2 (0)  Simon Eder  35:01.8 (2)
Overall standings after 7 of 25 events: (1) Tim Burke  253 points (2) Simon Fourcade  246 (3) Christoph Sumann  225
Pursuit standings after 2 of 6 events: (1) Eder 102 points (2) Ustyugov 100 (3) Burke 69

Bobsleigh
World Cup in Altenberg, Germany:
Four-man:  André Lange, René Hoppe, Kevin Kuske, Martin Putze  1:47.23  Steven Holcomb, Justin Olsen, Steve Mesler, Curtis Tomasevicz  1:47.99  Yevgeni Popov, Denis Moiseychenkov, Andrey Yurkov, Alexey Kireev  1:48.23
Standings (after 5 of 8 races): (1) Holcomb 1053 points (2) Jānis Miņins  938 (3) Lyndon Rush  913

Cricket
England in South Africa:
1st Test in Centurion, day 5:
 418 and 301/7d;  356 and 228/9. Match drawn. 4-match series level 0–0.
West Indies in Australia:
3rd Test in Perth, day 5:
 520/7d and 150;  312 and 323. Australia win by 35 runs, win the 3-match series 2–0.

Cross-country skiing
World Cup in Rogla, Slovenia:
Women's 15 km classic mass start:  Justyna Kowalczyk   Marit Bjørgen   Anna Haag 
Overall standings (after 8 of 20 events): (1) Bjørgen 447 points (2) Kowalczyk 397 (3) Petra Majdič  383
Distance standings (after 4 events): (1) Bjørgen 235 points (2) Irina Khazova  221 (3) Charlotte Kalla  218
Men's 30 km classic mass start:  Petter Northug   Alexander Legkov   Maxim Vylegzhanin 
Overall standings (after 8 of 20 events): (1) Northug 440 points (2) John Kristian Dahl  200 (3) Legkov 187
Distance standings (after 4 events): (1) Northug 260 points (2) Legkov 187 (3) Matti Heikkinen  160

Football (soccer)
 Colombian Primera A Clausura Final, second leg: (first leg score in parentheses)
Independiente Medellín 2–2 (1–0) Atlético Huila. Independiente Medellín win 3–2 on aggregate.
Independiente win the championship for the fifth time.

Freestyle skiing
World Cup in Changchun, China:
Men's aerials:  Jia Zongyang   Qi Guangpu   Anton Kushnir 
Standings after 2 of 6 events: (1)  Kushnir 160 points (2) Jia 136 (3) Liu Zhongqing  100
Women's aerials:  Xu Mengtao   Guo Xinxin   Zhang Zin 
Standings after 2 of 6 events: (1) Guo 180 points (2) Xu 160 (3) Li Nina  100

Golf
European Tour:
South African Open in Paarl, South Africa:
Winner: Richie Ramsay  275 (−13)PO
Ramsay wins his first European Tour title.

Handball
World Women's Championship in Nanjing, China:
3rd place:   31–26 
Final:   22–25  
Russia win the title for the third straight time and fourth in last five championships.

Nordic combined
World Cup in Ramsau, Austria:
HS98 / 10 km:  Björn Kircheisen  23:29.7  Magnus Moan  23:30.1  Felix Gottwald  23:30.4
Overall standings (after 7 of 19 events): (1) Jason Lamy-Chappuis  537 points (2) Tino Edelmann  424 (3) Petter Tande  271

Rugby union
Heineken Cup pool stage, matchday 4:
Pool 1: Perpignan  14–37 (Ireland) Munster
Standings: Munster 15 points, Northampton 13, Perpignan 6, Treviso 5.
Pool 2: Gloucester  19–6  Glasgow Warriors
Standings: Biarritz 18 points, Gloucester 8, Newport, Worcester 5.
Pool 4: Stade Français  29–16 (Ireland) Ulster
This match was originally intended to be held in Brussels the previous day, but heavy snowfall forced its move to Paris.
Standings: Stade Français 13 points, Ulster, Edinburgh 9, Bath 6.
Pool 5: Sale Sharks  21–17  Harlequins
Standings: Toulouse 14 points, Sale 13, Cardiff 9, Harlequins 2.
Amlin Challenge Cup pool stage, matchday 4:
Pool 1: Leeds Carnegie  47–0  București Oaks
Standings: Leeds, Bourgoin 14 points, București 6, Parma 4.
Pool 3: Rovigo  7–30  Toulon
Standings: Toulon 18 points, Saracens 13, Castres 6, Rovigo 0.
Pool 5: Albi  38–16  Petrarca Padova
Standings: Newcastle 15 points, Montauban 12, Albi 10, Padova 1 (3).

Ski jumping
World Cup in Engelberg, Switzerland:
HS 137:  Simon Ammann  144.8 points (141.0 m equal hill record)  Bjørn Einar Romøren  140.4 (138.0 m)  Daiki Ito  132.6 (134.5 m)
The final round is cancelled due to poor weather conditions.
Overall standings (after 6 of 23 events): (1) Ammann 424 points (2) Gregor Schlierenzauer  382 (3) Romøren 279

Snowboarding
World Cup in Telluride, United States:
Men's team snowboard cross:  Xavier De La Rue/Pierre Vaultier   Nate Holland/Nick Baumgartner   Mike Robertson/Drew Neilson 
Women's team snowboard cross:  Lindsey Jacobellis/Faye Gulini   Maëlle Ricker/Dominique Maltais   Simona Mieler/Tanja Frieden

December 19, 2009 (Saturday)

Alpine skiing
Men's World Cup in Val Gardena, Italy:
Downhill:  Manuel Osborne-Paradis  2:01.27  Mario Scheiber  2:01.40  Johan Clarey  & Ambrosi Hoffmann  2:01.52
Overall standings (after 12 of 34 races): (1) Carlo Janka  540 points (2) Benjamin Raich  515 (3) Didier Cuche  410
Downhill standings (after 3 of 8 races): (1) Cuche 206 points (2) Janka 160 (3) Michael Walchhofer  140
Women's World Cup in Val d'Isère, France:
Downhill: Cancelled

American football
NFL Week 15 (division champion in bold):
Dallas Cowboys 24, New Orleans Saints 17
 The Saints' bid for a perfect season ends.
NCAA bowl games:
New Mexico Bowl in Albuquerque, New Mexico: Wyoming 35, Fresno State 28 (2 OT)
St. Petersburg Bowl in St. Petersburg, Florida: Rutgers 45, UCF 24
Amos Alonzo Stagg Bowl (Division III championship) in Salem, Virginia:
Wisconsin-Whitewater 35, Mount Union 28
The Warhawks win their second national title in three years, making them 2–3 in the two teams' five consecutive Stagg Bowl matchups.

Biathlon
World Cup 3 in Pokljuka, Slovenia:
7.5 km sprint women:  Svetlana Sleptsova  24:57.0 (0 penalties)  Anna Bogaliy-Titovets  25:40.4 (1)  Magdalena Neuner  25:59.6 (2)
Overall standings after 6 of 25 events: (1) Helena Jonsson  306 points (2) Anna Carin Olofsson-Zidek  264 (3) Sleptsova 212
Sprint standings after 3 of 10 events: (1) Jonsson 126 points (2) Olofsson-Zidek 122 (3) Olga Medvedtseva  116
10 km sprint men:  Ivan Tcherezov  28:10.0 (0 penalties)  Dominik Landertinger  28:21.1 (1)  Thomas Frei  28:52.4 (1)
Overall standings after 6 of 25 events: (1) Christoph Sumann  225 points (2) Tim Burke  215 (3) Simon Fourcade  214
Sprint standings after 3 of 10 events: (1) Ole Einar Bjørndalen  120 points (2) Burke 103 (3)  Fourcade 101

Bobsleigh
World Cup in Altenberg, Germany:
Two-man:  André Lange/Kevin Kuske  1:49.81  Thomas Florschütz/Marc Kühne  1:50.47  Ivo Rüegg/Cedric Grand  1:50.71
Standings (after 5 of 8 races): (1) Rüegg 1010 points (2) Karl Angerer  914 (3) Florschütz 890
Two-woman:  Kaillie Humphries/Heather Moyse  1:53.60  Helen Upperton/Jennifer Ciochetti  1:54.03  Shauna Rohbock/Michelle Rzepka  1:54.11
Standings (after 5 of 8 races): (1) Sandra Kiriasis  1022 (2) Humphries 961 (3) Rohbock 953

Cricket
England in South Africa:
1st Test in Centurion, day 4:
 418 & 301/7d (Hashim Amla 100);  356 & 11/1 (6.0 ov). England require another 353 runs with 9 wickets remaining.
West Indies in Australia:
3rd Test in Perth, day 4:
 520/7d & 150;  312 & 308/9 (91.0 ov). West Indies require another 51 runs with 1 wicket remaining.

Cross-country skiing
World Cup in Rogla, Slovenia:
Women's sprint classic:  Marit Bjørgen   Justyna Kowalczyk   Petra Majdič 
Overall standings (after 7 of 20 events): (1) Bjørgen 362 points (2) Majdič 332 (3) Aino-Kaisa Saarinen  308
Sprint standings (after 4 events): (1) Majdič 260 points (2) Bjørgen 212 (3) Kowalczyk 185
Men's sprint classic:  Petter Northug   Tobias Angerer   Jesper Modin 
Overall standings (after 7 of 20 events): (1) Northug 340 points (2) John Kristian Dahl  200 (3) Ola Vigen Hattestad  170
Sprint standings (after 4 events): (1) Dahl 200 points (2) Northug 180 (3) Hattestad 170

Football (soccer)
FIFA Club World Cup in Abu Dhabi, United Arab Emirates:
Bronze medal match:  Pohang Steelers  1–1 (4–3 pen.)  Atlante
Final:  Estudiantes  1–2 (ET)   Barcelona
Barcelona win the title for the first time and their sixth trophy of the year.

Freestyle skiing
World Cup in Changchun, China:
Men's aerials:  Anton Kushnir   Liu Zhongqing   Wu Chao 
Women's aerials:  Guo Xinxin   Li Nina   Xu Mengtao

Nordic combined
World Cup in Ramsau, Austria:
HS98 / 10 km:  Jason Lamy Chappuis  25:45.6  Tino Edelmann  25:47.7  Alessandro Pittin  25:49.3
Overall standings (after 6 of 19 events): (1) Lamy-Chappuis 505 points (2) Edelmann 384 (3) Eric Frenzel  240

Rugby union
Heineken Cup pool stage, matchday 4: (teams in strike are eliminated)
Pool 1: Benetton Treviso  18–21  Northampton Saints
Standings: Northampton 13 points (4 matches), Munster 10 (3), Perpignan 6 (3), Treviso 5 (4).
Pool 2: Newport Gwent Dragons   8–26  Biarritz
Standings: Biarritz 18 points (4 matches), Newport 5 (4), Glasgow 5 (3), Gloucester 4 (3).
Pool 3:
Ospreys  45–19  Viadana
Leicester Tigers  20–15  Clermont Auvergne
Standings: Ospreys 16 points, Leicester, Clermont 12, Viadana 0.
Pool 4: Edinburgh  9–6  Bath
Standings: Stade Français, Ulster 9 points (3 matches), Edinburgh 9 (4), Bath 6 (4).
Pool 5: Toulouse  23–7  Cardiff Blues
Standings: Toulouse 14 points (4 matches), Sale 9 (3), Cardiff 9 (4), Harlequin 1 (3).
Pool 6:
London Irish  34–13  Brive
Leinster (Ireland) 39–7  Scarlets
Standings: Leinster, London Irish 15, Scarlets 8, Brive 0.
Amlin Challenge Cup pool stage, matchday 4: (teams in strike are eliminated)
Pool 2: Olympus Madrid  6–42  Montpellier
Standings: Connacht 17 points, Montpellier 15, Worcester 7, Madrid 0.
Pool 3:
Rovigo  –  Toulon, postponed to Sunday (snow)
Saracens  18–14  Castres Olympique
Standings: Toulon 13 points (3 matches), Saracens 13 (4), Castres 6 (4), Rovigo 0 (3).
Pool 4: Rugby Roma Olimpic  3–53  Racing Métro
Standings: London Wasps 17 points, Racing Métro 12, Bayonne 10, Roma 0.
Pool 5: Albi  –  Petrarca Padova postponed

Ski jumping
World Cup in Engelberg, Switzerland:
HS 137:  Gregor Schlierenzauer  265.6 points (137.0 m, 130.0 m)  Simon Ammann  264.6 (138.0, 129.0)  Andreas Kofler  250.5 (132.0, 128.0)
Overall standings (after 5 of 23 events): (1) Schlierenzauer 342 (2) Ammann 324 points (3) Kofler 226

Snowboarding
World Cup in Telluride, United States:
Men's snowboard cross:  Pierre Vaultier   Robert Fagan   Ross Powers 
Standings after 2 of 7 events: (1) Vaultier 2000 points (2) Seth Wescott  1200 (3) Fagan 1090
Women's snowboard cross:  Maëlle Ricker   Simona Meiller    Dominique Maltais 
Standings after 2 of 7 events: (1) Ricker 2000 points (2) Maltais 1200 (3) Aleksandra Zhekova  1160

Volleyball
NCAA Division I women's tournament:
Championship game in Tampa, Florida: Penn State 3, Texas 2.
The Nittany Lions rally from a 2-set deficit to win the title for the third straight time and extend their winning streak to 102 games.

December 18, 2009 (Friday)

Alpine skiing
Men's World Cup in Val Gardena, Italy:
Super-G:  Aksel Lund Svindal  1:38.35  Carlo Janka  1:38.47  Patrick Staudacher  1:38.52
Overall standings (after 11 of 34 races): (1) Janka 540 points (2) Benjamin Raich  515 (3) Svindal 388
Super-G standings (after 3 of 6 races): (1) Michael Walchhofer  180 (2) Raich & Svindal 154
Women's World Cup in Val d'Isère, France:
Super combined: Lindsey Vonn  2:37.55  Maria Riesch  2:38.71  Elisabeth Görgl  2:38.91
Overall standings (after 10 of 33 races): (1) Riesch & Vonn 521 (3) Kathrin Zettel  362

American football
NCAA Division I FCS:
NCAA Division I Football Championship Game in Chattanooga, Tennessee (seeds in parentheses):
(2) Villanova 23, (1) Montana 21

Cricket
England in South Africa:
1st Test in Centurion, day 3:
 418 & 9/1 (4.0 ov);  356. South Africa led by 71 runs with 9 wickets remaining.
West Indies in Australia:
3rd Test in Perth, day 3:
 520/7d & 137/8 (47.0 ov);  312. Australia led by 345 runs with 2 wickets remaining.
Sri Lanka in India:
2nd ODI in Visakhapatnam:
 301/7 (50 ov, MS Dhoni 107);  302/7 (49.1 ov, Tillakaratne Dilshan 123). Sri Lanka win by 3 wickets. 5-match series level 1–1.

Handball
World Women's Championship in China:
Semifinals:
 27–23 
 20–28

Ice hockey
 New Jersey Devils goaltender Martin Brodeur makes his 1,030th NHL regular-season appearance, breaking the league record for goaltenders previously held by Patrick Roy, as the Devils beat the Ottawa Senators 4–2. (AP via ESPN)

Nordic combined
World Cup in Ramsau, Austria:
HS98 / 10 km:  Jason Lamy Chappuis  22:03.6  Felix Gottwald  22:06.3  Magnus Moan  22:10.7
Overall standings (after 5 of 19 events): (1) Lamy-Chappuis 405 points (2) Tino Edelmann  304 (3) Eric Frenzel  240

Rugby union
Amlin Challenge Cup pool stage, matchday 4: (teams in strike are eliminated)
Pool 2: Connacht  19–7  Worcester Warriors
Standings: Connacht 17 points (4 matches), Montpellier 10 (3), Worcester 7 (4), Olympus Madrid 0 (3).
Pool 5: Montauban  24–19  Newcastle Falcons
Standings: Newcastle 15 points (4 matches), Montauban 12, Albi 5 (3), Padova 1 (3).

Six-red snooker
Six-red World Championship in Killarney, Ireland:
Final: Mark Davis  def. Mark Williams  6–3

Ski jumping
World Cup in Engelberg, Switzerland:
HS 137:  Simon Ammann  270.4 points (137.5 m, 133.0 m)  Gregor Schlierenzauer  268.2 (136.5, 132.5)  Thomas Morgenstern  243.5 (132.5, 125.0)
Overall standings (after 4 of 23 events): (1) Ammann 244 points (2) Schlierenzauer 242 (3) Harri Olli  & Andreas Kofler  166

Skeleton
World Cup in Altenberg, Germany:
Men:  Michi Halilovic  1:56.39  Aleksandr Tretyakov  1:56.60  Frank Rommel  1:56.63
Standings after 5 of 8 events: (1) Martins Dukurs  1044 points (2) Rommel 1011 (3) Sandro Stielicke  892
Women:  Kerstin Szymkowiak  1:59.50  Marion Trott  2:00.21  Anja Huber  2:00.28
Standings after 5 of 8 events: (1) Mellisa Hollingsworth  1011 points (2) Shelley Rudman  987 (3) Szymkowiak 954

Swimming
World records broken:
Long course:
Men's 50 m freestyle: César Cielo  20.91, São Paulo, Brazil
Short course:
Men's 4 × 100 m medley relay:  (Nick Thoman, Mark Gangloff, Michael Phelps, Nathan Adrian) 3:20.71, Manchester, Great Britain
Women's 200 m breast: Rebecca Soni  2:14.57, Manchester, Great Britain
Women's 400 m medley: Julia Smit  4:21.04, Manchester, Great Britain
Women's 4 × 100 m medley relay:  (Margaret Hoelzer, Jessica Hardy, Dana Vollmer, Amanda Weir) 3:47.97, Manchester, Great Britain

December 17, 2009 (Thursday)

American football
National Football League Week 15 Thursday Night Football (unbeaten team and division champion in bold):
Indianapolis Colts 35, Jacksonville Jaguars 31
 The Colts extend their record regular-season win streak to 23, and become the third team in NFL history to start a season 14–0.

Basketball
Euroleague Regular Season Game 8: (teams in bold advance to the Top-16 round, teams in strike are eliminated)
Group A:
Regal FC Barcelona   89–55  Žalgiris Kaunas
Standings: Barcelona 8–0; Siena 7–1; ASVEL, Fenerbahçe Ülker 3–5; Cibona 2–6; Žalgiris 1–7.
Group B:
Efes Pilsen Istanbul  77–79  Unicaja Málaga
Entente Orléans Loiret  75–72  Partizan Belgrade
Standings: Olympiacos, Unicaja 6–2; Lietuvos Rytas, Partizan 4–4; Efes Pilsen 3–5; Orléans 1–7.
Group C:
CSKA Moscow  77–72  Maccabi Tel Aviv
Standings: CSKA, Caja Laboral 6–2; Maccabi 5–3; Maroussi, Roma 3–5; Olimpija 1–7.
Group D:
Panathinaikos Athens  67–76  Real Madrid
Armani Jeans Milano  82–69  Asseco Prokom Gdynia
Standings: Real Madrid, Panathinaikos 6–2; Khimki 5–3; Milano, Asseco Prokom 3–5; EWE Baskets 1–7.

Biathlon
World Cup 3 in Pokljuka, Slovenia:
15 km individual women:  Helena Jonsson  43:04.1 (0 penalties)  Anna Carin Olofsson-Zidek  43:26.7 (1)  Anastasiya Kuzmina  43:31.4 (1)
Overall standings after 5 of 25 events: (1) Jonsson 277 points (2) Olofsson-Zidek 234 (3) Olga Medvedtseva  184
Individual standings after 2 of 4 events: (1) Jonsson 120 points (2) Olofsson-Zidek 108 (3) Valj Semerenko  74
20 km individual men:  Christoph Sumann  52:19.8 (1 penalty)  Simon Fourcade  52:34.0 (1)  Alexander Os  52:50.5 (1)
Overall standings after 5 of 25 events: (1) Sumann 225 (2) Emil Hegle Svendsen  206 (3) Tim Burke  181
Individual standings after 2 of 4 events: (1) Sumann 108 points (2) Burke 81 (3) Fourcade 79

Cricket
England in South Africa:
1st Test in Centurion, day 2:
 418 (Jacques Kallis 120);  88/1 (23.0 ov). England trail by 330 runs with 9 wickets remaining in the 1st innings.
West Indies in Australia:
3rd Test in Perth, day 2:
 520/7d;  214/2 (46.0 ov, Chris Gayle 102). West Indies trail by 306 runs with 8 wickets remaining in the 1st innings.

Football (soccer)
UEFA Europa League group stage, Matchday 6: (teams in bold advance to the round of 32)
Group A:
Ajax  1–3  Anderlecht
Dinamo Zagreb  1–2  Timişoara
Final standings: Anderlecht, Ajax 11 points, Dinamo Zagreb 6, Timişoara 5.
Group B:
Lille  3–1  Slavia Prague
Genoa  1–2  Valencia
Final standings: Valencia 12 points, Lille 10, Genoa 7, Slavia Prague 3.
Group C:
Hapoel Tel Aviv  1–0  Hamburg
Rapid Wien  3–3  Celtic
Final standings: Hapoel Tel Aviv 12 points, Hamburg 10, Celtic 6, Rapid Wien 5.
Group G:
Lazio  0–1  Levski Sofia
Villarreal  0–1  Red Bull Salzburg
Final standings: Red Bull Salzburg 18 points, Villarreal 9, Lazio 6, Levski Sofia 3.
Group H:
Steaua București  1–1  Twente
Fenerbahçe  1–0  Sheriff Tiraspol
Final standings: Fenerbahçe 15 points, Twente 8, Sheriff Tiraspol 5, Steaua București 4.
Group I:
Benfica  2–1  AEK Athens
Everton  0–1  BATE Borisov
Final standings: Benfica 15 points, Everton 9, BATE 7, AEK Athens 4.

Handball
World Women's Championship in China:
9th place:  25–41 
11th place:  26–25 
7th place:  35–25 
5th place:  33–31

Rugby union
Amlin Challenge Cup pool stage, matchday 4: (teams in strike are eliminated)
Pool 1: Bourgoin  31–10  Overmach Parma
Standings: Bourgoin 14 points (4 matches), Leeds Carnegie 9 (3), Bucharest Oaks 6 (3), Overmach Parma 4 (4).
Pool 4: Bayonne  3–12  London Wasps
Standings: London Wasps 17 points (4 matches), Bayonne 10 (4), Racing Métro 7 (3), Roma 0 (3).

Snowboarding
World Cup in Telluride, United States:
Men's parallel giant slalom:  Jasey Jay Anderson   Michael Lambert    Rok Flander 
Standings (after 3 of 9 events): (1) Benjamin Karl  2060 points (2) Anderson 2050 (3) Mathieu Bozzetto  1560
Women's parallel giant slalom:  Alena Zavarzina   Marion Kreiner   Ina Meschik 
Standings (after 3 of 9 events): (1) Amelie Kober  2060 (2) Doris Guenther  1700 (3) Claudia Riegler  1500

December 16, 2009 (Wednesday)

Basketball
Euroleague Regular Season Game 8: (teams in bold advance to the Top-16 round, teams in strike are eliminated)
Group A:
Cibona Zagreb  80–77  Fenerbahçe Ülker İstanbul
Montepaschi Siena  83–74  ASVEL Villeurbanne
Standings: Barcelona 7–0, Siena 7–1, ASVEL, Fenerbahçe Ülker 3–5, Cibona 2–6, Žalgiris 1–6.
Group B:
Lietuvos Rytas Vilnius  83–89 (OT)  Olympiacos Piraeus
Standings: Olympiacos 6–2, Unicaja 5–2, Partizan 4–3, Lietuvos Rytas 4–4, Efes Pilsen 3–4, Orléans 0–7.
Group C:
Caja Laboral Baskonia  62–53  Union Olimpija Ljubljana
Lottomatica Roma  74–87  Maroussi Athens
Standings: Caja Laboral 6–2, Maccabi, CSKA Moscow 5–2, Maroussi, Roma 3–5, Olimpija 1–7.
Group D:
EWE Baskets Oldenburg  49–62  Khimki Moscow Region
Standings: Panathinaikos 6–1, Real Madrid 5–2, Khimki 5–3, Asseco Prokom 3–4, Milano 2–5, EWE Baskets 1–7.

Cricket
England in South Africa:
1st Test in Centurion, day 1:
 262/4 (Jacques Kallis 112*)
West Indies in Australia:
3rd Test in Perth, day 1:
 339/3
Simon Katich is dismissed on 99 for the second time in his career.

Football (soccer)
FIFA Club World Cup in Abu Dhabi, United Arab Emirates:
Fifth place match: TP Mazembe  2–3  Auckland City
Semifinal 2: Atlante  1–3   Barcelona
UEFA Europa League group stage, Matchday 6: (teams in bold advance to the round of 32)
Group D:
Hertha BSC  1–0  Sporting CP
Heerenveen  5–0  Ventspils
Final standings: Sporting CP 11 points, Hertha BSC 10, Heerenveen 8, Ventspils 3.
Group E:
CSKA Sofia  0–3  Roma
Basel  2–3  Fulham
Final standings: Roma 13 points, Fulham 11, Basel 9, CSKA Sofia 1.
Group F:
Panathinaikos  3–0  Dinamo București
Sturm Graz  1–0  Galatasaray
Final standings: Galatasaray 13 points, Panathinaikos 12, Dinamo București 6, Sturm Graz 4.
Group J:
Club Brugge  1–0  Toulouse
Partizan  1–0  Shakhtar Donetsk
Final standings: Shakhtar Donetsk 13 points, Club Brugge 11, Toulouse 7, Partizan 3.
Group K:
Sparta Prague  0–3  Copenhagen
CFR Cluj  0–2  PSV Eindhoven
Final standings: PSV Eindhoven 14 points, Copenhagen 10, Sparta Prague 7, CFR Cluj 3.
Group L:
Athletic Bilbao  0–3  Werder Bremen
Nacional  5–1  Austria Wien
Final standings: Werder Bremen 16 points, Athletic Bilbao 10, Nacional 5, Austria Wien 2.
 Colombian Primera A Clausura Final, first leg:
Atlético Huila 0–1 Independiente Medellín

December 15, 2009 (Tuesday)

Basketball
2010 FIBA World Championship Draw:
Group A:      
Group B:      
Group C:      
Group D:

Cricket
Pakistan in New Zealand:
3rd Test in Napier, day 5:
 223 and 455;  471 and 90/0. Match drawn. 3-match series drawn 1–1.
Sri Lanka in India:
1st ODI in Rajkot:
 414/7 (50 ov, Virender Sehwag 146);  411/8 (50 ov, Tillakaratne Dilshan 160). India win by 3 runs, lead the 5-match series 1–0

Football (soccer)
FIFA Club World Cup in Abu Dhabi, United Arab Emirates:
Semifinal 1: Pohang Steelers  1–2  Estudiantes

Handball
World Women's Championship in China: (teams in bold advance to the semifinals, teams in strike are eliminated)
Group 1 in Yangzhou:
 25–21 
 35–20 
 25–30 
Final standings: France, Russia 8 points, Denmark 6, Germany 4, Austria, Angola 2.
Group 2 in Suzhou:
 25–21 
 27–24 
 34–34 
Final standings: Norway 8 points, Spain 7, Korea 6, Romania 5, Hungary 4, China 0.

Snowboarding
World Cup in Telluride, United States:
Men's parallel giant slalom:  Matthew Morison   Benjamin Karl   Mathieu Bozzetto 
Women's parallel giant slalom:  Fraenzi Maegert-Kohli   Amelie Kober   Kimiko Zakreski

December 14, 2009 (Monday)

American football
NFL Monday Night Football, Week 14:
San Francisco 49ers 24, Arizona Cardinals 9

Cricket
Pakistan in New Zealand:
3rd Test in Napier, day 4:
 223 & 347/4 (141.0 ov);  471. Pakistan led by 99 runs with 6 wickets remaining.

December 13, 2009 (Sunday)

Alpine skiing
Men's World Cup in Val d'Isère, France:
Giant slalom:  Marcel Hirscher  2:16.28  Massimiliano Blardone  2:17.05  Benjamin Raich  2:17.60
Giant slalom standings (after 3 of 7 races): (1) Raich 185 points (2) Carlo Janka  160 (3) Ted Ligety  156
Overall standings (after 10 of 34 races): (1) Raich 486 points (2) Janka 460 (3) Didier Cuche  384
Women's World Cup in Åre, Sweden:
Slalom:  Sandrine Aubert  1:43.24  Maria Riesch  1:43.69  Susanne Riesch  1:44.20
Slalom standings (after 3 of 8 races): (1) Maria Riesch 225 points (2) Šárka Záhrobská  168 (3) Susanne Riesch 160
Overall standings (after 9 of 33 races): (1) Maria Riesch 441 points (2) Lindsey Vonn  421 (3) Kathrin Zettel  330

American football
NFL Week 14 (division champions in bold; teams clinching a playoff berth in italics):
New Orleans Saints 26, Atlanta Falcons 23
The Saints remain unbeaten and secure a first-round bye in the NFC playoffs.
Green Bay Packers 21, Chicago Bears 14
Indianapolis Colts 28, Denver Broncos 16
The Colts set a new NFL record with their 22nd consecutive regular-season win, and also secure home-field advantage throughout the AFC playoffs. The Broncos' Brandon Marshall sets an NFL single-game record with 21 receptions.
Buffalo Bills 16, Kansas City Chiefs 10
Minnesota Vikings 30, Cincinnati Bengals 10
New England Patriots 20, Carolina Panthers 10
New York Jets 26, Tampa Bay Buccaneers 3
Miami Dolphins 14, Jacksonville Jaguars 10
Baltimore Ravens 48, Detroit Lions 3
Houston Texans 34, Seattle Seahawks 7
Washington Redskins 34, Oakland Raiders 13
Tennessee Titans 47, St. Louis Rams 7
San Diego Chargers 20, Dallas Cowboys 17
Sunday Night Football: Philadelphia Eagles 45, New York Giants 38

Biathlon
World Cup 2 in Hochfilzen, Austria:
4 x 6 km relay women:  Russia (Svetlana Sleptsova, Anna Boulygina, Iana Romanova, Olga Zaitseva) 1:13.37.0 (0 penalty, 6 reloads)  France (Marie-Laure Brunet, Sylvie Becaert, Marie Dorin, Sandrine Bailly) 1:13:40.8 (0, 7)  Sweden (Elisabeth Högberg, Anna Carin Olofsson-Zidek, Anna-Maria Nilsson, Helena Jonsson) 1:13:41.6 (0, 3)
Standings (after two of five events): (1) Russia 114 points (2) Germany 103 (3) France 102
4 x 7.5 km relay men:  Austria (Simon Eder, Daniel Mesotitsch, Dominik Landertinger, Christoph Sumann) 1:16:13.1 (0 penalty loops, 6 reloads)  Russia (Ivan Tcherezov, Evgeny Ustyugov, Nikolay Kruglov, Jr., Maxim Tchoudov) 1:16:38.8 (1, 5)  Germany (Christoph Stephan, Arnd Peiffer, Michael Greis, Simon Schempp 1:16:45.1 (0, 5)
Standings (after two of five events): (1) Austria 108 points (2) France 103 (3) Russia 97

Bobsleigh
World Cup in Winterberg, Germany:
Four-man:  United States (Steven Holcomb, Justin Olsen, Steve Mesler, Curtis Tomasevicz) 1:50.70  Germany (André Lange, René Hoppe, Kevin Kuske, Martin Putze) 1:50.80  Germany (Karl Angerer, Andreas Udvari, Alex Mann, Gregor Bermbach) 1:50.95
Standings (after 4 of 8 races): (1) Holcomb 843 points (2) Jānis Miņins  754 (3) Lyndon Rush  721

Cricket
Pakistan in New Zealand:
3rd Test in Napier, day 3:
 223 & 128/0 (56.0 ov);  471 (Daniel Vettori 134). Pakistan trail by 120 runs with 10 wickets remaining.

Cross-country skiing
World Cup in Davos, Switzerland:
Women's sprint freestyle:  Petra Majdič   Marit Bjørgen   Aino-Kaisa Saarinen 
Overall standings (after 6 of 20 events): (1) Majdič 272 points (2) Saarinen 263 (3) Bjørgen 262
Sprint standings (after 3 events): (1) Majdič 200 points (2) Hanna Falk  176 (3) Vesna Fabjan  114
Men's sprint freestyle:  John Kristian Dahl   Petter Northug   Alexey Petukhov 
Overall standings (after 6 of 20 events): (1) Northug 240 points (2) Dahl 200 (3) Petukhov 160
Sprint standings (after 3 events): (1) Dahl 200 points (2) Petukhov 160 (3) Ola Vigen Hattestad  160

Football (soccer)
CECAFA Cup in Kenya:
Third place playoff:   1–0 
Final:   2–0  
Uganda win the title for the second straight time and 11th overall.
South Asian Football Federation Cup Final in Dhaka, Bangladesh:
 0–0 (1–3 pen.) 
India win the title for the fifth time.
 Argentine Primera División – Apertura, final matchday:
(12) Boca Juniors 2–0 (1) Banfield
(2) Newell's Old Boys 0–2 (8) San Lorenzo
Final standings: Banfield 41 points, Newell's Old Boys 39.
Banfield win their first ever championship.
 Primera División Uruguaya – Apertura, final matchday:
(10) Cerrito 2–5 (1) Nacional
(3) Defensor Sporting 2–2 (2) Liverpool
Final standings: Nacional 36 points, Liverpool, Defensor Sporting 29.
Nacional win the title for the 42nd time.
 Primera División Venezolana – Apertura, final matchday:
(1) Deportivo Italia 0–1 (5) Deportivo Lara
(7) Deportivo Anzoátegui 2–0 (2) Caracas
(3) Deportivo Táchira 1–0 (16) Centro Italo
Final standings: Deportivo Táchira 37 points, Deportivo Italia 36, Caracas 35.
Deportivo Táchira win the title for the seventh time.
 Primera División de Paraguay – Clausura, final matchday:
(1) Nacional 0–0 (6) Olimpia
(7) Tacuary 1–0 (2) Libertad
Standings: Nacional 41 points, Libertad 40.
Nacional win their seventh title after a break of 63 years.
 Campeonato Descentralizado playoff, second leg: (first leg score in parentheses)
Universitario de Deportes 1–0 (1–0) Alianza Lima. Universitario win 2–0 on aggregate.
Universitario win the title for the 25th time.
 Primera División de México Apertura Liguilla Final, second leg: (first leg score in parentheses)
Cruz Azul 1–2 (3–4) Monterrey. Monterrey win 6–4 on aggregate.
Monterrey win the title for the third time.

Golf
European Tour:
Alfred Dunhill Championship in Mpumalanga, South Africa:
Winner: Pablo Martín  271 (−17)
Off-season men's events:
The Shark Shootout in Naples, Florida:
Winners: Jerry Kelly & Steve Stricker

Handball
World Women's Championship in China: (teams in bold advance to the semifinals, teams in strike are eliminated)
Group 1 in Yangzhou:
 26–29 
 23–24 
 28–23 
Standings: Russia, France, Denmark 6 points, Austria, Angola, Germany 2.
Group 2 in Suzhou:
 28–28 
 19–34 
 26–25 
Standings: Spain 7 points, Norway 6, Korea 5, Romania 4, Hungary 2, China 0.

Luge
World Cup in Lillehammer, Norway:
Women:  Tatjana Hüfner  1:37.579  Natalie Geisenberger  1:37.595  Erin Hamlin  1:37.616
World Cup standings (after 4 of 8 events): (1) Hüfner 385 points (2) Geisenberger 355 (3) Anke Wischnewski  265
Men:  Albert Demtschenko  1:40.356  Armin Zöggeler  1:40.406  Felix Loch  1:40.674
World Cup standings (after 4 of 8 events): (1) Zöggeler 370 points (2) Loch 290 (3) Demtschenko 279

Nine-ball
Mosconi Cup in Las Vegas, Nevada, United States, day 4:
Team Europe 7–11 Team USA
Ralf Souquet  def. Shane Van Boening  6–3
Dennis Hatch  def. Niels Feijen  6–0
Thorsten Hohmann  def. Johnny Archer  6–1
Shane Van Boening  def. Ralf Souquet  6–2
Team USA win the Mosconi Cup for the first time in 4 years and 11th time overall.

Rugby union
Heineken Cup pool stage, matchday 3:
Pool 2: Biarritz  49–13  Newport Gwent Dragons
Standings: Biarritz 14 points, Newport Gwent Dragons, Glasgow Warriors 5, Gloucester 4.
Pool 3: Clermont Auvergne  40–30  Leicester Tigers
Standings: Ospreys, Clermont Auvergne 11 points, Leicester Tigers 8, Viadana 0.
Pool 4: Bath  16–9  Edinburgh
Standings: Stade Français, Ulster 9 points, Bath, Edinburgh 5.
Pool 5: Harlequins  19–29  Sale Sharks
Standings: Toulouse 10 points, Sale Sharks, Cardiff Blues 9, Harlequins 1.

Snooker
Pukka Pies UK Championship in Telford, England:
Final:
Ding Junhui  (13) def. John Higgins  (2) 10–8

Snowboarding
World Cup in Seoul, South Korea:
Men's big air:  Gian-Luca Cavigelli   Stefan Gimpl   Markku Koski 
Standings (after 4 of 5 events): (1) Gimpl 3800 points (2) Cavigelli 3100 (3) Gjermund Braaten  1460

Speed skating
World Cup 5 in Salt Lake City, United States
1000 m women:  Christine Nesbitt  1:13.36  Wang Beixing  1:14.01  Nao Kodaira  1:14.17
Standings after 4 of 7 races: (1) Nesbitt 400 points (2) Annette Gerritsen  205 (3) Kodaira 202
1000 m men:  Shani Davis  1:06.67  Lee Kyou-hyuk  1:07.07  Mika Poutala  1:07.24
Standings after 4 of 7 races: (1) Davis 400 points (2) Mo Tae-bum  215 (3) Lee 212
Team pursuit women:  Russia (Yekaterina Abramova, Galina Likhachova, Yekaterina Shikhova) 2:57.18  Canada (Kristina Groves, Christine Nesbitt, Cindy Klassen) 2:57.35  Germany (Daniela Anschütz-Thoms, Stephanie Beckert, Katrin Mattscherodt) 2:57.36
Standings after 3 of 4 races: (1) Canada 280 points (2) Russia 230 (3) Japan 190
Team pursuit men:  Norway (Håvard Bøkko, Mikael Flygind-Larsen, Henrik Christiansen) 3:39.55  Italy (Matteo Anesi, Enrico Fabris, Luca Stefani) 3:39.72  Canada (Steven Elm, Lucas Makowsky, Mathieu Giroux) 3:40.34
Standings after 3 of 4 races: (1) Netherlands 260 points (2) Norway 230 (3) Canada 186

Swimming
European Short Course Championships in Istanbul, Turkey:
Women's 50 m freestyle:  Hinkelien Schreuder  23.32 CR  Ranomi Kromowidjojo  23.58  Dorothea Brandt  23.74
Men's 50 m butterfly:  Johannes Dietrich  22.07 CR  Frédérick Bousquet  22.17  Yevgeny Korotyshkin  22.34
Women's 400 m individual medley:  Hannah Miley  4:25.66  Mireia Belmonte García  4:27.60  Zsuzsanna Jakabos  4:28.46
Men's 200 m breaststroke:  Dániel Gyurta  2:00.67 WR  Grigory Falko  2:02.50  Maxim Shcherbakov  2:03.76
Women's 200 m freestyle:  Federica Pellegrini  1:51.17 WR  Evelyn Verrasztó  1:52.61  Femke Heemskerk  1:54.20
Men's 200 m freestyle:  Paul Biedermann  1:39.81 CR  Danila Izotov  1:40.08  Nikita Lobintsev  1:41.52
Women's 200 m backstroke:  Alexianne Castel  2:02.67  Jenny Mensing  2:03.31  Pernille Larsen  2:03.50
Men's 4x50 m freestyle:  France (Amaury Leveaux, Jérémy Stravius, David Maitre, Frédérick Bousquet) 1:22.96  Croatia (Duje Draganja, Alexei Puninski, Mario Todorovic, Mario Delač) 1:23.18  Italy (Marco Orsi, Federico Bocchia, Filippo Magnini, Luca Dotto) 1:23.64

December 12, 2009 (Saturday)

Alpine skiing
Men's World Cup in Val d'Isère, France:
Super-G:  Michael Walchhofer  1:20.78  Ted Ligety  1:21.06  Werner Heel  1:21.53
Super-G standings (after 2 of 6 races): (1) Walchhofer 160 points (2) Benjamin Raich  125 (3) Ligety 112
Overall standings (after 9 of 34 races): (1) Carlo Janka  460 points (2) Raich 426 (3) Didier Cuche  384
Women's World Cup in Åre, Sweden:
Giant slalom:  Tessa Worley  2:23.22  Tina Maze  2:23.79  Kathrin Zettel  2:23.91
Giant slalom standings (after 3 of 7 races): (1) Zettel 220 points (2) Kathrin Holzl  181 (3) Maze 170
Overall standings (after 8 of 33 races): (1) Lindsey Vonn  389 points (2) Maria Riesch  361 (3) Zettel 280

American football
NCAA Division I FBS:
Army–Navy Game in Philadelphia: Navy 17, Army 3
Navy wins the game for the eighth straight year.
Mark Ingram II wins the Heisman Trophy. The Alabama running back edges out his Stanford counterpart Toby Gerhart in the closest vote in the award's history, becoming the Crimson Tide's first Heisman winner and the third straight sophomore to win the award.
NCAA Division I FCS:
Semifinal in Missoula, Montana (unbeaten team in bold):
(1) Montana 24, Appalachian State 17
Other games:
SWAC Championship Game in Birmingham, Alabama:
Prairie View A&M 30, Alabama A&M 24
NCAA Division II Football Championship in Florence, Alabama:
Northwest Missouri State 30, Grand Valley State 23
The Bearcats win their third Division II national title and end a streak of four consecutive losses in the championship game.

Basketball
2010 FIBA World Championship:
FIBA announces the four wild cards that will participate in the World Championship to be held in Turkey:

Biathlon
World Cup 2 in Hochfilzen, Austria:
10 km pursuit women:  Helena Jonsson  34:09.1 (1 penalty)  Svetlana Sleptsova  34:40.8 (2)  Olga ZaitsevaR 34:45.1 (2)
Overall standings after 4 of 25 events: (1) Jonsson 217 points (2) Anna Carin Olofsson-Zidek  180 (3) Sleptsova 152
12.5 km pursuit men:  Emil Hegle Svendsen  34:36.7 (1)  Simon Eder  34:38.3 (1)  Ole Einar Bjørndalen  34:39.8 (3)
Overall standings after 4 of 25 events: (1) Svendsen 206 points (2) Bjørndalen 168 (3) Christoph Sumann  165

Bobsleigh
World Cup in Winterberg, Germany:
Two-man:  Beat Hefti/Thomas Lamparter  1:53.17  Karl Angerer/Gregor Bermbach  1:53.24  Ivo Rüegg/Roman Handschin  1:53.28
Standings (after 4 of 8 races): (1) Rüegg  810 points (2) Steven Holcomb  770 (3) Angerer 722
Two-woman:  Cathleen Martini/Romy Logsch  1:56.65  Sandra Kiriasis/Berit Wiacker  1:57.26  Erin Pac/Elana Meyers  1:57.27
Standings (after 4 of 8 races): (1) Martini 885 points (2) Kiriasis 830 (3) Shauna Rohbock  753

Cricket
Pakistan in New Zealand:
3rd Test in Napier, day 2:
 223;  346/6 (106.0 ov, Daniel Vettori 100*). New Zealand led by 123 runs with 4 wickets remaining in the 1st innings.
Sri Lanka in India:
2nd T20I in Chandigarh:
 206/7 (20/20 ov);  211/4 (19.1/20 ov). India win by 6 wickets. 2-match series drawn 1–1.

Cross-country skiing
World Cup in Davos, Switzerland:
Women's 10 km freestyle:  Irina Khazova   Charlotte Kalla   Kristina Šmigun-Vähi 
Men's 15 km freestyle:  Matti Heikkinen   Marcus Hellner   Maurice Manificat

Curling
European Championships in Aberdeen, Scotland:
Men, final:
 Sweden 6–5  Switzerland (11 ends)
Niklas Edin skips Sweden to their sixth title and the first since 2001.
Men, world challenge game 2:
Denmark 10–5 Netherlands
Denmark win best-of-3 series 2–0.
Women, final:
 Switzerland 5–7  Germany
Andrea Schöpp skips Germany to her seventh European title, and the first since 1998.
Women, world challenge game 2:
Finland 3–6 Latvia
Latvia win best-of-3 series 2–0.

Football (soccer)
FIFA Club World Cup in Abu Dhabi, United Arab Emirates:
Quarterfinal 2: Auckland City  0–3  Atlante

Freestyle skiing
World Cup at Suomu, Finland:
Men's moguls:  Jesper Bjoernlund   Bryon Wilson   Nathan Roberts 
Standings (after 2 of 12 events): (1) Bjoernlund 200 points (2) Wilson 160 (3) Alexandre Bilodeau  110
Women's moguls:  Hannah Kearney   Kristi Richards   Jennifer Heil 
Standings (after 2 of 12 events): (1) Richards 180 points (2) Kearney 160 (3) Heil 105

Handball
World Women's Championship in China: (teams in bold advance to the semifinals, teams in strike are eliminated)
Group 1 in Yangzhou:
 22–34 
 33–24 
 30–27 
Standings: Russia, Denmark 6 points, France 4, Austria 2, Angola, Germany 0.
Group 2 in Suzhou:
 40–19 
 27–28 
 21–21 
Standings: Spain 5 points, Romania, Korea, Norway 4, Hungary 1, China 0.

Luge
World Cup in Lillehammer, Norway:
Doubles:  Andreas Linger/Wolfgang Linger  1:36.829  Christian Oberstolz/Patrick Gruber  1:36.917  Gerhard Plankensteiner/Oswald Haselrieder  1:37.053
World Cup standings (after 4 of 8 events): (1) André Florschütz/Torsten Wustlich  325 points (2) Patric Leitner/Alexander Resch  300 (3) Linger/Linger 290

Mixed martial arts
UFC 107 in Memphis
Lightweight Championship bout: B.J. Penn  def. Diego Sanchez  via TKO (cut) at 2:37 of round 5
Penn retain the UFC Lightweight Championship.

Nine-ball
Mosconi Cup in Las Vegas, Nevada, United States, day 3:
Team Europe 5–9 Team USA
Niels Feijen  / Thorsten Hohmann  def. Dennis Hatch  / Corey Deuel  6–1
Ralf Souquet  / Mika Immonen  def. Shane Van Boening  / Óscar Domínguez  6–4
Dennis Hatch  def. Niels Feijen  6–4
Corey Deuel  / Johnny Archer  def. Thorsten Hohmann  / Darren Appleton  6–5
Mika Immonen  def. Óscar Domínguez  6–4

Rugby union
Heineken Cup pool stage, matchday 3:
Pool 1: Northampton Saints  30–18  Benetton Treviso
Standings: Munster 10 points, Northampton Saints 9, Perpignan 6, Benetton Treviso 4.
Pool 3: Viadana  7–62  Ospreys
Standings: Ospreys 11 points (3 matches), Leicester Tigers 8 (2), Clermont 6 (2), Viadana 0 (3).
Pool 4: Ulster  23–13  Stade Français
Standings: Stade Français, Ulster 9 points (3 matches), Edinburgh 4 (2), Bath 1 (2).
Pool 5: Cardiff Blues  15–9  Toulouse
Standings: Toulouse 10 points (3 matches), Blues 9 (3), Sale Sharks 4 (2), Harlequins 1 (2).
Pool 6:
Scarlets  7–32  Leinster
Brive  3–36  London Irish
 Standings: London Irish, Leinster 10 points, Scarlets 8, Brive 0.
Amlin Challenge Cup pool stage, matchday 3:
Pool 1:
București Oaks  6–10  Leeds Carnegie
Overmach Parma  14–9  Bourgoin
Standings: Leeds Carnegie, Bourgoin 9 points, Bucharest Oaks 6, Overmach Parma 4.
Pool 2: Worcester Warriors  21–26  Connacht
Standings: Connacht 13 points, Montpellier 10 points, Worcester Warriors 7, Olympus Madrid 0.
Pool 4:
London Wasps  22–18  Bayonne
Racing Métro  62–0  Rugby Roma Olimpic
Standings: London Wasps 13 points, Bayonne 10, Racing Métro 7, Roma 0.
Pool 5: Petrarca Padova  16–35  Albi
Standings: Newcastle Falcons 14 points, Montauban 8, Albi 5, Petrarca Padova 1.
IRB Sevens World Series:
South Africa Sevens in George, Western Cape
Cup Final:  21–12

Speed skating
World Cup 5 in Salt Lake City, United States
500 m women:  Wang Beixing  37.02  Jenny Wolf  37.17  Lee Sang-hwa  37.24
Standings (after 8 of 12 races): (1) Wolf 760 points (2) Wang 680 (3) Lee 505
500 m men:  Lee Kyou-hyuk  34.26  Lee Kang-seok  34.28  Tucker Fredricks  34.35
Standings (after 8 of 12 races): (1) Lee Kang-seok 523 points (2) Lee Kyou-hyuk 521 (3) Mika Poutala  501
1500 m women:  Christine Nesbitt  1:52.76  Kristina Groves  1:53.32  Jennifer Rodriguez  1:54.19
Standings (after 5 of 6 races): (1) Groves 410 points (2) Nesbitt 360 (3) Ireen Wüst  257
5000 m men:  Enrico Fabris  6:06.06  Bob de Jong  6:08.76  Ivan Skobrev  6:10.58
Standings (after 5 of 6 races): (1) Sven Kramer  400 (2) de Jong 380 (3) Skobrev 325

Snooker
Pukka Pies UK Championship in Telford, England:
Semi-finals:
John Higgins  (2) def. Ronnie O'Sullivan  (3) 9–8

Swimming
European Short Course Championships in Istanbul, Turkey:
Women's 50 m backstroke:  Sanja Jovanović  25.70 WR  Aleksandra Gerasimenya  26.12  Ksenia Moskvina  26.38
Men's 50 m breaststroke:  Aleksander Hetland  26.19  Alessandro Terrin  26.24  Csaba Szilágyi  26.31
Women's 400 m freestyle:  Coralie Balmy  3:56.55  Lotte Friis  3:59.06  Ophelie Cyrielle Etienne  3:59.94
Men's 100 m backstroke:  Arkady Vyatchanin  & Stanislav Donets  48.97 WR  Aschwin Wildeboer  49.05
Women's 100 m breaststroke:  Caroline Ruhnau  1:04.84 CR  Moniek Nijhuis  1:04.96  Jennie Johansson  1:05.19
Men's 100 m individual medley:  Duje Draganja  51.20  Sergey Fesikov  51.29  Peter Mankoč  51.52
Women's 100 m butterfly:  Inge Dekker  55.74  Diane Bui Duyet  55.93  Jeanette Ottesen  56.02
Men's 200 m butterfly:  Nikolay Skvortsov  1:49.46 ER  Paweł Korzeniowski  1:50.13  Dinko Jukić  1:50.32
Women's 4x50 m medley relay:  Netherlands (Hinkelien Schreuder, Moniek Nijhuis, Inge Dekker, Ranomi Kromowidjojo) 1:42.69 WBT  Sweden (Emma Svensson, Josefin Lillhage, Sarah Sjöström, Claire Hedenskog) 1:45.13  Russia (Ksenia Moskvina, Daria Deeva, Olga Klyuchnikova, Svetlana Fedulova) 1:46.10
Men's 1500 m freestyle:  Jan Wolfgarten  14:20.44  Federico Colbertaldo  14:25.68  Mads Glæsner  14:26.74

December 11, 2009 (Friday)

Alpine skiing
Men's World Cup in Val d'Isère, France:
Super combined:
 Benjamin Raich  2:07.71  Marcel Hirscher  2:08.60  Manfred Moelgg  & Romed Baumann  2:09.26
Overall standings after 8 of 34 races: (1) Carlo Janka  460 points (2) Raich 381 (3) Didier Cuche  355

American football
NCAA Division I FCS:
Semifinal in Villanova, Pennsylvania:
(2) Villanova 14, William & Mary 13

Biathlon
World Cup 2 in Hochfilzen, Austria:
7.5 km sprint women:  Anna Carin Olofsson-Zidek  23:10.8 (0 penalty loops)  Helena Jonsson  23:21.9 (0)  Olga Zaitseva  24:00.5 (1)
Overall standings after 3 of 25 events: (1) Jonsson 157 points (2) Olofsson-Zidek 146 (3) Olga Medvedtseva  124
Sprint standings after 2 of 10 events: (1) Jonsson 97 points (2) Olofsson-Zidek 92 (3) Medvedtseva 92
10 km sprint men:  Ole Einar Bjørndalen  26:14.0 (0)  Nikolay Kruglov, Jr.  26:20.7 (0)  Evgeny Ustyugov  26:24.1 (1)
Overall standings after 3 of 25 events: (1) Emil Hegle Svendsen  146 points (2) Tim Burke  123 (3) Christoph Sumann  122
Sprint standings after 2 of 10 events: (1)  Bjørndalen 120 (2) Svendsen 86 (3) Sumann 74

Cricket
Pakistan in New Zealand:
3rd Test in Napier, day 1:
 223 (Imran Farhat 117*);  47/0 (19.0 ov). New Zealand trail by 176 runs with 10 wickets remaining in the 1st innings.

Curling
European Championships in Aberdeen, Scotland:
Men, semifinal:
 Norway 5–8 Switzerland
Switzerland will play against Sweden in the Final.
Men, world challenge game 1:
Denmark 6–2 Netherlands
Women, semifinal:
 Denmark 5–6 Germany
Germany will meet Switzerland in the final.
Women, world challenge game 1:
Finland 4–6 Latvia

Football (soccer)
FIFA Club World Cup in Abu Dhabi, United Arab Emirates:
Quarterfinal 1: TP Mazembe  1–2  Pohang Steelers

Freestyle skiing
World Cup in Suomu, Finland:
Men's moguls:  Jesper Bjoernlund   Bryon Wilson   Alexandre Bilodeau 
Women's moguls:  Kristi Richards   Aiko Uemura   Hannah Kearney

Golf
 Following a tumultuous two weeks in which he faced allegations of numerous extramarital affairs, Tiger Woods admits to infidelity and announces he is taking an indefinite leave from professional golf in an attempt to save his marriage. (ESPN)

Nine-ball
Mosconi Cup in Las Vegas, Nevada, United States, day 2:
Team Europe 2–7 Team USA
Shane Van Boening  / Johnny Archer  def. Ralf Souquet  / Niels Feijen  6–2
Thorsten Hohmann  def. Corey Deuel  6–4
Óscar Domínguez  / Dennis Hatch  def. Mika Immonen  / Darren Appleton  6–4
Johnny Archer  def. Darren Appleton  6–5

Rugby union
Heineken Cup pool stage, matchday 3:
Pool 1: Munster (Ireland) 24–23  Perpignan
Standings: Munster 10 points (3 matches), Perpignan 6 (3), Northampton Saints, Benetton Treviso 4 (2).
Pool 2: Glasgow Warriors  33–11  Gloucester
Standings: Biarritz 9 points (2 matches), Newport Gwent Dragons 5 (2), Glasgow Warriors 5 (3), Gloucester 4 (3).
Amlin Challenge Cup pool stage, matchday 3:
Pool 2: Montpellier  57–24  Olympus Madrid
Standings: Montpellier 10 points (3 matches), Connacht 9 (2), Worcester Warriors 6 (2), Olympus Madrid 0 (3).
Pool 3:
Castres Olympique  9–23  Saracens
Toulon  73–3  Rovigo
Standings: Toulon 13 points, Saracens 9, Castres 5, Rovigo 0.

Skeleton
World Cup in Winterberg, Germany:
Men:  Martins Dukurs  1:59.06  Frank Rommel  1:59.81  Aleksandr Tretyakov  1:59.87
Standings after 4 of 8 races: (1) Dukurs 860 points (2) Rommel 811 (3) Sandro Stielicke  764
Women:  Kerstin Szymkowiak  2:04.72  Mellisa Hollingsworth  2:05.22  Svetlana Trunova  2:05.49
Standings after 4 of 8 races: (1) Hollingsworth 835 points (2) Shelley Rudman  819 (3) Szymkowiak 729

Speed skating
World Cup 5 in Salt Lake City, United States
500 m women:  Jenny Wolf  37.00 WR  Wang Beixing  37.14  Lee Sang-hwa  37.24
Standings (after 7 of 12 races): (1) Wolf 680 pts (2) Wang 580 (3) Lee 435
500 m men:  Lee Kyou-hyuk  34.26  Yuya Oikawa  34.27  Mika Poutala  34.31
Standings (after 7 of 12 races): (1) Poutala 465 pts (2) Lee Kang-seok  443 (3) Lee Kyou-hyuk 421
3000 m women:  Martina Sáblíková  3:56.29  Stephanie Beckert  3:57.78  Kristina Groves  3:58.67
Standings (after 5 of 6 races): (1) Sáblíková 460 points (2) Beckert 430 (3) Daniela Anschütz-Thoms 315
1500 m men:  Shani Davis  1:41.04 WR  Chad Hedrick  1:42.19  Mo Tae-bum  1:42.85
Standings (after 5 of 6 races): (1) Davis 480 points (2) Håvard Bøkko  350 (3) Hedrick 268

Snooker
Pukka Pies UK Championship in Telford, England:
Semi-finals:
Ding Junhui  (13) def. Stephen Maguire  (4) 9–5

Swimming
European Short Course Championships in Istanbul, Turkey:
Women's 800 m freestyle:   Lotte Friis  8:08.02  Erika Villaécija García  8:13.93  Ophelie Cyrielle Etienne  8:16.20
Men's 400 m individual medley:  László Cseh  3:57.27 WR  Dávid Verrasztó  4:00.10  Gal Nevo  4:00.55
Women's 200 m breaststroke:  Rikke Møller-Pedersen  2:16.66 ER  Nađa Higl  2:17.52  Joline Hoestman  2:19.28
Men's 100 m breaststroke:  Robin van Aggele  56.29 ER  Dániel Gyurta  56.72  Igor Borysik  56.97
Women's 100 m freestyle:  Inge Dekker  51.35 CR  Ranomi Kromowidjojo  51.44  Jeanette Ottesen  52.18
Women's 100 m backstroke:  Ksenia Moskvina  56.36 ER  Sanja Jovanović  56.93  Aleksandra Gerasimenya  57.23
Men's 100 m butterfly:  Yevgeny Korotyshkin  48.93 CR  Peter Mankoč  49.65  Ivan Lenđer  49.79
Women's 50 m butterfly:  Inge Dekker  & Hinkelien Schreuder  25.00 CR  Ingvild Snildal  25.10
Men's 50 m backstroke:  Stanislav Donets  22.76 ER  Thomas Rupprath  22.85  Aschwin Wildeboer  23.07
Women's 4x50 m freestyle:  Netherlands (Inge Dekker, Hinkelien Schreuder, Saskia de Jonge, Ranomi Kromowidjojo) 1:33.25 WBT  Sweden (Emma Svensson, Josefin Lillhage, Claire Hedenskog, Sarah Sjöström) 1:35.46  Germany (Dorothea Brandt, Daniela Samulski, Lisa Vitting, Daniela Schreiber) 1:36.73

December 10, 2009 (Thursday)

American football
NFL Week 14:
Cleveland Browns 13, Pittsburgh Steelers 6

Basketball
Euroleague Regular Season Game 7: (teams in bold advance to the Top-16 round, teams in strike are eliminated)
Group A:
Cibona Zagreb  68–80  Regal FC Barcelona
Žalgiris Kaunas  72–83  Montepaschi Siena
Standings: Barcelona 7–0, Siena 6–1, ASVEL, Fenerbahçe Ülker 3–4, Cibona, Žalgiris 1–6.
Group B:
Olympiacos Piraeus  89–68  Unicaja Málaga
Partizan Belgrade  93–92  Efes Pilsen Istanbul
Standings: Olympiacos, Unicaja 5–2, Lietuvos Rytas, Partizan 4–3, Efes Pilsen 3–4,  Orléans 0–7.
Group C:
Maccabi Tel Aviv  82–91  Caja Laboral Baskonia
Lottomatica Roma   57–72  CSKA Moscow
Standings: Caja Laboral, CSKA Moscow, Maccabi 5–2, Roma 3–4, Maroussi 2–5, Olimpija 1–6.

Curling
European Championships in Aberdeen, Scotland: (teams in bold advance to the playoff, teams in italics clinch tiebreak berths, teams in strike are eliminated)
Women, draw 9:
Denmark 7–5 Scotland
Finland 2–7 Germany
Switzerland 6–7 Russia
Norway 2–10 Sweden
Italy 9–5 England
Final standings: Switzerland 7 wins, Denmark, Germany, Sweden, Russia 6, Scotland 5, Norway 4, Finland 3, Italy 2, England 0.
Men, tiebreak:
Scotland 7–2 France
Women, tiebreak:
Sweden 4–5 Russia
Men, playoffs: (seeding in parentheses)
(1) Norway 3–7 (2) Sweden
Sweden advance to the final, Norway go to semifinal
(3) Switzerland 7–3 (4) Scotland
Switzerland go to semifinal
Women, playoffs: (seeding in parentheses)
(1) Switzerland 8–5 (2) Denmark
Switzerland advance to the final, Denmark go to semifinal
(3) Germany 10–4 (4) Russia
Germany go to semifinal

Football (soccer)
CECAFA Cup in Kenya:
Semifinals:  1–2

Handball
World Women's Championship in China: (teams in bold advance to the Main Round, teams in strike are eliminated)
Group A:
 28–36 
 15–29 
 27–23 
Final standings: Denmark 8 points, France, Germany, Sweden 6, Brazil 4, Congo 0.
Group B:
 25–18 
 31–32 
 23–21 
Final standings: Russia 10 points, Austria, Angola, Ukraine 6, Thailand 2, Australia 0.
Group C:
 34–16 
 25–24 
 35–28 
Final standings: Norway 10 points, Romania 8, Hungary 6, Japan, Tunisia 3, Chile 0.
Group D:
 24–28 
 35–21 
 28–27 
Final standings: Spain 10 points, Korea 8, China 6, Côte d'Ivoire 3, Kazakhstan 2, Argentina 1.

Nine-ball
Mosconi Cup in Las Vegas, Nevada, United States, day 1:
Team Europe 1–4 Team USA
Team USA def. Team Europe 6–4 
Johnny Archer  / Dennis Hatch  def. Niels Feijen  / Darren Appleton  6–5
Shane Van Boening  def. Mika Immonen  6–3
Corey Deuel  / Óscar Domínguez  def. Ralf Souquet  / Thorsten Hohmann  6–2
Ralf Souquet  def. Óscar Domínguez  6–5

Rugby union
Amlin Challenge Cup pool stage, matchday 3:
Pool 5: Newcastle Falcons  17–6  Montauban
Standings: Newcastle 14 points (3 matches), Montauban 8 (3), Petrarca Padova 1 (2), Albi 0 (2).
The Varsity Match in London:
Oxford 27–31 Cambridge
The Light Blues, captained by former Australia international Dan Vickerman, avenge last year's defeat at the hands of the Dark Blues.

Snooker
Pukka Pies UK Championship in Telford, England:
Quarter-finals:
John Higgins  (2) def. Liang Wenbo  9–2
Ronnie O'Sullivan  (3) def. Mark Selby  (7) 9–3

Swimming
European Short Course Championships in Istanbul, Turkey:
Men's 400 m freestyle:  Paul Biedermann  3:34.55 CR  Nikita Lobintsev  3:35.75  Mads Glæsner  3:36.82
Men's 200 m backstroke:  Stanislav Donets  1:48.62 CR  Radosław Kawecki  1:49.13  Evgeny Aleshin  1:49.31
Women's 200 m individual medley:  Evelyn Verrasztó  2:04.64 WR  Francesca Segat  2:06.21  Hannah Miley  2:06.96
Women's 200 m butterfly:  Aurore Mongel  2:03.22 CR  Petra Granlund  2:03.82  Franziska Hentke  2:04.68
Men's 200 m individual medley:  Markus Rogan  1:51.72 ER  Vytautas Janušaitis  1:52.22  Alan Cabello Forns  1:53.04
Men's 50 m freestyle:  Frédérick Bousquet  20.53  Duje Draganja  20.70  Sergey Fesikov  20.84
Women's 50 m breaststroke:  Moniek Nijhuis  29.68 CR  Jane Trepp  29.82  Janne Schaefer  29.92
Men's 4x50 m medley relay:  Russia (Stanislav Donets, Sergey Geybel, Yevgeny Korotyshkin, Sergey Fesikov) 1:31.80 WBT  Germany (Thomas Rupprath, Hendrik Feldwehr, Johannes Dietrich, Stefan Herbst) 1:32.02  France (Benjamin Stasiulis, Hugues Duboscq, Frédérick Bousquet, Amaury Leveaux) 1:32.13

December 9, 2009 (Wednesday)

Basketball
Euroleague Regular Season Game 7: (teams in bold advance to the Top-16 round, teams in strike are eliminated)
Group A:
Fenerbahçe Ülker İstanbul  61–68  ASVEL Villeurbanne
Standings: Barcelona 6–0, Siena 5–1, Villeurbanne, Fenerbahçe Ülker 3–4, Cibona, Žalgiris 1–5.
Group B:
Lietuvos Rytas Vilnius  77–72  Entente Orléans Loiret
Standings: Unicaja 5–1, Olympiacos 4–2, Lietuvos Rytas 4–3, Efes Pilsen, Partizan 3–3,  Orléans 0–7.
Group C:
Maroussi Athens  74–62  Union Olimpija Ljubljana
Standings: Maccabi 5–1, CSKA Moscow, Caja Laboral 4–2, Roma 3–3, Maroussi 2–5, Olimpija 1–6.
Group D:
Khimki Moscow Region  82–87 (OT)  Panathinaikos Athens
Asseco Prokom Gdynia  82–76  Real Madrid
Armani Jeans Milano   79–51  EWE Baskets Oldenburg
Standings: Panathinaikos 6–1, Real Madrid 5–2, Khimki 4–3, Asseco Prokom 3–4, Milano 2–5, EWE Baskets 1–6.

Cricket
Sri Lanka in India:
1st T20I in Nagpur:
 215/5 (20/20 ov);  186/9 (20/20 ov). Sri Lanka win by 29 runs, lead the 2-match series 1–0.

Curling
European Championships in Aberdeen, Scotland: (teams in bold advance to the playoff, teams in italics secure tie break berth, teams in strike are eliminated)
Men, draw 8:
Switzerland 6–5 Scotland
Sweden 9–1 Finland
Czech Republic 3–9 Norway
Denmark 8–2 Italy
Germany 8–6 France
Standings: Norway, Sweden 7 wins, France, Scotland, Switzerland 5, Germany 4, Denmark 3, Czech Republic, Finland 2, Italy 0.
Women, draw 8:
Italy 9–10 Finland
Denmark 6–7 Switzerland
Norway 5–7 Scotland
England 7–8 Germany
Russia 4–5 Sweden
Standings: Switzerland 7 wins, Denmark, Germany, Russia, Scotland, Sweden 5, Norway 4, Finland 3, Italy 1, England 0.
Men, draw 9:
Sweden 3–10 Norway
Scotland 9–4 Italy
Finland 6–9 Germany
Czech Republic 4–10 France
Switzerland 7–3 Denmark
Final standings: Norway 8 wins, Sweden 7, Switzerland, Scotland, France 6, Germany 5, Denmark 3, Finland, Czech Republic 2, Italy 0.

Football (soccer)
CECAFA Cup in Kenya:
Semifinals:  2–1 
FIFA Club World Cup in Abu Dhabi, United Arab Emirates:
First Round: Auckland City  2–0  Al-Ahli
UEFA Champions League group stage, Matchday 6: (teams in bold advance to the round of 16, teams in italics advance to the round of 32 in Europa League, teams in strike are eliminated)
Group E:
Liverpool  1–2  Fiorentina
Lyon  4–0  Debrecen
Final standings: Fiorentina 15 points, Lyon 13, Liverpool 7, Debrecen 0.
Group F:
Internazionale  2–0  Rubin Kazan
Dynamo Kyiv  1–2  Barcelona
Final standings: Barcelona 11 points, Inter 9, Rubin Kazan 6, Dynamo Kyiv 5.
Group G:
Stuttgart  3–1  Unirea Urziceni
Sevilla  1–0  Rangers
Final standings: Sevilla 13 points, Stuttgart 9, Unirea Urziceni 8, Rangers 2.
Group H:
Olympiacos  1–0  Arsenal
Standard Liège  1–1  AZ
Final standings: Arsenal 13 points, Olympiacos 10, Standard Liège 5, AZ 4.
 Primera División Chilena Clausura playoff final, second leg: (first leg score in parentheses)
Universidad Católica 2–4 (2–2) Colo-Colo. Colo-Colo win 6–4 on aggregate.
Colo-Colo win the championship for the 29th time.

Handball
World Women's Championship in China: (teams in bold advance to the Main Round, teams in strike are eliminated)
Group A:
 29–22 
 21–28 
 27–33 
Standings: Denmark 8 points, Germany 6, Sweden, France 4, Brazil 2, Congo 0.
Group B:
 36–16 
 7–40 
 19–32 
Standings: Russia 8 points, Austria, Angola 6, Ukraine 4, Thailand, Australia 0.
Group C:
 19–38 
 19–25 
 39–22 
Standings: Romania, Norway 8 points, Hungary 4, Japan 3, Tunisia 1, Chile 0.
Group D:
 22–30 
 12–27 
 36–15 
Standings: Spain, Korea 8 points, China 4, Côte d'Ivoire 3, Argentina 1, Kazakhstan 0.

Snooker
Pukka Pies UK Championship in Telford, England:
Quarter-finals:
Ding Junhui  (13) def. Ali Carter  (5) 9–8
Stephen Maguire  (4) def. Peter Lines  9–5

December 8, 2009 (Tuesday)

Cricket
West Indies in Australia:
2nd Test in Adelaide, day 5:
 451 and 317 (Chris Gayle 165*);  439 and 212/5. Match drawn, Australia lead the 3-match series 1–0.
ICC Intercontinental Shield:
 v  in Windhoek, day 4:
Namibia 369 & 237; United Arab Emirates 297 & 311/6 (64.1 ov, Khurram Khan 109). United Arab Emirates win by 4 wickets.
Standings (1 match each): Uganda 20 points, UAE 14, Namibia 6, Bermuda 0.

Curling
European Championships in Aberdeen, Scotland: (teams in bold advance to the playoff, teams in italics secure tie break berth, teams in strike are eliminated)
Men, draw 6:
Czech Republic 5–10 Sweden
Germany 7–10 Scotland
Switzerland 13–4 Italy
France 7–5 Norway
Denmark 9–3 Finland
Standings: Scotland, Norway, Sweden, France 5 wins, Switzerland 3, Czech Republic, Finland, Germany 2, Denmark 1, Italy 0.
Women, draw 6:
Norway 9–3 Denmark
Russia 7–8 Finland
Italy 4–7 Germany
Sweden 2–8 Scotland
England 2–8 Switzerland
Standings: Russia, Switzerland 5 wins, Sweden, Denmark 4, Germany, Scotland, Norway 3, Finland 2, Italy 1, England 0.
Men, draw 7:
Italy 1–9 Germany
Czech Republic 4–7 Denmark
Sweden 6–5 France
Finland 2–8 Switzerland
Scotland 5–9 Norway
Standings: Norway, Sweden 6 wins, France, Scotland 5, Switzerland 4, Germany 3, Czech Republic, Denmark, Finland 2, Italy 0.
Women, draw 7:
Germany 6–3 Russia
Norway 9–7 England
Denmark 5–4 Sweden
Switzerland 10–6 Italy
Finland 4–7 Scotland
Standings: Switzerland 6 wins, Denmark, Russia 5, Scotland, Sweden, Norway, Germany 4, Finland 2, Italy 1, England 0.

Football (soccer)
CECAFA Cup in Kenya:
Quarterfinals:
 4–0 
 4–1 
UEFA Champions League group stage, Matchday 6: (teams in bold advance to the round of 16, teams in italics advance to the round of 32 in Europa League, teams in strike are eliminated)
Group A:
Juventus  1–4  Bayern Munich
Maccabi Haifa  0–1  Bordeaux
Final standings: Bordeaux 16 points, Bayern Munich 10, Juventus 8, Maccabi Haifa 0.
Maccabi Haifa become the first team in the Champions League history to lose all matches in the group stage and fail to score a goal.
Group B:
Wolfsburg  1–3  Manchester United
Beşiktaş  1–2  CSKA Moscow
Final standings: Manchester United 13 points, CSKA Moscow 10, Wolfsburg 7, Beşiktaş 4.
Group C:
Zürich  1–1  Milan
Marseille  1–3  Real Madrid
Final standings: Real Madrid 13 points, Milan 9, Marseille 7, Zürich 4.
Group D:
Chelsea  2–2  APOEL
Atlético Madrid  0–3  Porto
Final standings: Chelsea 14 points, Porto 12, Atlético Madrid, APOEL 3.

Snooker
Pukka Pies UK Championship in Telford, England:
Round of 16:
Mark Selby  (7) def. Stephen Hendry  (10) 9–5
John Higgins  (2) def. Neil Robertson  (9) 9–8
Stephen Maguire  (4) def. Stuart Bingham  9–3
Liang Wenbo  def. Mark King  (16) 9–2
Ding Junhui  (13) def. Shaun Murphy  (1) 9–3
Ronnie O'Sullivan  (3) def. Peter Ebdon  (14) 9–3
Stephen Maguire  (4) def. Stuart Bingham  9–3
Peter Lines  def. Mark Williams  (15) 9–8
Ali Carter  (5) def. Stephen Lee  9–5

December 7, 2009 (Monday)

American football
NFL Monday Night Football, Week 13:
Green Bay Packers 27, Baltimore Ravens 14

Baseball
 Hall of Fame balloting:
 The Veterans Committee announces the results of its biennial elections for non-playing personnel.  Whitey Herzog, former manager of four teams, most notably the St. Louis Cardinals, and former National League umpire Doug Harvey are elected from the ballot for managers and umpires. No candidate is elected from the executives' ballot. (Hall of Fame press release)

Cricket
West Indies in Australia:
2nd Test in Adelaide, day 4:
 451 & 284/8 (93.0 ov, Chris Gayle 155*);  439. West Indies led by 296 runs with 2 wickets remaining.
ICC Intercontinental Shield:
 v  in Windhoek, day 3:
Namibia 369 & 134/3 (66.0 ov); United Arab Emirates 297. Namibia led by 206 runs with 7 wickets remaining.

Curling
European Championships in Aberdeen, Scotland:
Women, draw 4:
England 3–10 Sweden
Scotland 3–6 Russia
Germany 10–5 Norway
Finland 4–6 Switzerland
Denmark 8–2 Italy
Standings: Russia 4 wins, Denmark, Sweden, Switzerland 3, Germany, Scotland, Norway 2, Italy 1, England, Finland 0.
Men, draw 5:
Norway 9–7 Finland
France 7–5 Switzerland
Denmark 3–8 Scotland
Italy 2–8 Sweden
Czech Republic 4–7 Germany
Standings: Norway 5 wins, France, Scotland, Sweden 4, Czech Republic, Finland, Germany, Switzerland 2, Denmark, Italy 0.
Women, draw 5:
Scotland 5–11 Switzerland
Sweden 7–5 Italy
England 3–10 Finland
Germany 4–7 Denmark
Norway 5–9 Russia
Standings: Russia 5 wins, Denmark, Sweden, Switzerland 4, Germany, Scotland, Norway 2, Finland, Italy 1, England 0.

Football (soccer)
CECAFA Cup in Kenya:
Quarterfinals:
 1–0 
 0–0 (3–4 pen.)

Handball
World Women's Championship in China: (teams in bold advance to the Main Round)
Group A:
 32–30 
 37–24 
 23–21 
Standings: Denmark 6 points, Germany, Sweden 4, Brazil, France 2, Congo 0.
Group B:
 41–13 
 21–28 
 48–8 
Standings: Russia, Austria 6 points, Angola 4, Ukraine 2, Australia, Thailand 0.
Group C:
 31–31 
 44–15 
 31–25 
Standings: Norway, Romania 6 points, Hungary 4, Tunisia, Japan 1, Chile 0.
Group D:
 19–19 
 33–25 
 30–12 
Standings: Spain, Korea 6 points, China 4, Côte d'Ivoire, Argentina 1, Kazakhstan 0.

Ice hockey
 NHL news:
 New Jersey Devils goaltender Martin Brodeur collects his 103rd career shutout in the Devils' 3–0 win over the Buffalo Sabres, tying the league record of Terry Sawchuk. (AP via ESPN)

Snooker
Pukka Pies UK Championship in Telford, England:
Round of 32:
Ronnie O'Sullivan  (3) def. Matthew Stevens  9–3
Ali Carter  (5) def. Rory McLeod  9–7
Ding Junhui  (13) def. Mike Dunn  9–5
Peter Lines  def. Marco Fu  (8) 9–3

December 6, 2009 (Sunday)

Alpine skiing
Men's World Cup in Beaver Creek, United States:
Giant slalom:  Carlo Janka   Benjamin Raich   Aksel Lund Svindal 
Overall standings after 7 of 34 races: (1) Janka 460 points (2) Didier Cuche  355 (3) Raich 281
Women's World Cup in Lake Louise, Canada:
Super-G: Elisabeth Görgl   Lindsey Vonn   Ingrid Jacquemod 
Overall standings after 7 of 33 races: (1)  Vonn 389 points (2) Maria Riesch  361 (3) Kathrin Zettel  220

American football
NFL Week 13 (teams in bold have clinched division title):
Philadelphia Eagles 34, Atlanta Falcons 7
 Michael Vick runs for a touchdown and throws for another in his return to Atlanta, where he played before his imprisonment.
Chicago Bears 17, St. Louis Rams 9
Cincinnati Bengals 23, Detroit Lions 13
Indianapolis Colts 27, Tennessee Titans 17
The Colts tie an NFL record with their 21st consecutive regular-season win.
Jacksonville Jaguars 23, Houston Texans 18
Oakland Raiders 27, Pittsburgh Steelers 24
Denver Broncos 44, Kansas City Chiefs 13
Miami Dolphins 22, New England Patriots 21
Carolina Panthers 16, Tampa Bay Buccaneers 6
New Orleans Saints 33, Washington Redskins 30 (OT)
The Saints remain unbeaten and clinch the NFC South title. Drew Brees becomes the fifth quarterback this season to pass for at least 400 yards in a game.
San Diego Chargers 30, Cleveland Browns 23
New York Giants 31, Dallas Cowboys 24
Seattle Seahawks 20, San Francisco 49ers 17
Sunday Night Football: Arizona Cardinals 30, Minnesota Vikings 17
NCAA Division I FBS:
BCS bowl game matchups (unbeaten teams in bold):
BCS National Championship Game, January 7 in Pasadena, California: Texas vs. Alabama
Rose Bowl, January 1 in Pasadena, California: Ohio State vs. Oregon
Sugar Bowl, January 1 in New Orleans: Cincinnati vs. Florida
Fiesta Bowl, January 4 in Glendale, Arizona: Boise State vs. TCU
This will be the first time ever that two unbeaten teams play in a BCS game other than the National Championship Game, and also the first time ever that two teams from the non-automatic qualifying conferences earn BCS berths in the same season.
Orange Bowl, January 5 in Miami Gardens, Florida: Iowa vs. Georgia Tech

Auto racing
V8 Supercars:
Telstra 500 in Sydney, New South Wales

Badminton
BWF Super Series:
Super Series Masters Finals in Johor Bahru, Malaysia:
Men's singles: Lee Chong Wei 
Women's singles: Wong Mew Choo 
Men's doubles: Jung Jae Sung/Lee Yong Dae 
Women's doubles: Wong Pei Tty/Chin Eei Hui 
Mixed doubles: Joachim Fischer Nielsen/Christinna Pedersen

Biathlon
World Cup 1 in Östersund, Sweden:
Men's 4 x 7.5 km relay:  France (Vincent Jay, Vincent Defrasne, Simon Fourcade, Martin Fourcade) 1:15:10.3 (1 penalty loops + 7 extra shots)  Norway (Emil Hegle Svendsen, Alexander Os, Lars Berger, Ole Einar Bjørndalen 1:15:24.0 (3+11)  Austria (Daniel Mesotitsch, Simon Eder, Dominik Landertinger, Christoph Sumann) 1:15:28.5 (1+8)
Women's 4 x 6 km relay:  Germany (Martina Beck, Andrea Henkel, Simone Hauswald, Kati Wilhelm) 1:10:52.5 (0 penalty loops + 9 extra shots)  Russia (Svetlana Sleptsova, Anna Boulygina, Olga Zaitseva, Olga Medvedtseva) 1:11:10.9 (0+9)  France (Marie-Laure Brunet, Sylvie Becaert, Marie Dorin, Sandrine Bailly) 1:12:17.7 (0+10)

Bobsleigh
World Cup in Cesana, Italy:
Four-man:  United States (Steven Holcomb, Justin Olsen, Steve Mesler, Curtis Tomasevicz) 1:51.22  Switzerland (Ivo Rüegg, Roman Handschin, Cedric Grand, Patrick Bloechliger) 1:51.63  Canada (Lyndon Rush, Chris le Bihan, Dan Humphries, Lascelles Brown) 1:51.67
Standings (after 3 of 8 races): (1) Holcomb 618 points (2) Rush 593 (3) Jānis Miņins  586

Cricket
Sri Lanka in India:
3rd Test in Mumbai, day 5:
 393 and 309 (Kumar Sangakkara 137);  726/9d. India win by an innings and 24 runs, win the 3-match series 2–0.
The win takes India to the top of the ICC Test Championship for the first time.
Pakistan in New Zealand:
2nd Test in Wellington, day 4:
 264 and 239;  99 and 263. Pakistan win by 141 runs. 3-match series level 1–1.
West Indies in Australia:
2nd Test in Adelaide, day 3:
 451 and 0 for 23;  439. Australia led by 35 runs with 10 wickets remaining.
ICC Intercontinental Shield:
 v  in Windhoek, day 2:
Namibia 369; United Arab Emirates 185/3 (58.0 ov). United Arab Emirates trail by 184 runs with 7 wickets remaining in the 1st innings.

Cross-country skiing
World Cup in Düsseldorf, Germany:
Women's team sprint freestyle:  Italy (Magda Genuin, Arianna Follis)  Sweden (Ida Ingemarsdotter, Hanna Falk)  Norway (Celine Brun-Lie, Maiken Caspersen Falla)
Men's team sprint freestyle:  Russia (Nikolay Morilov, Alexey Petukhov)  Norway (Eirik Brandsdal, Anders Gløersen)  Sweden (Robin Bryntesson, Björn Lind)

Curling
European Championships in Aberdeen, Scotland: (unbeaten teams in bold)
Men, draw 3:
Scotland 2–3 Czech Republic
Denmark 5–7 Sweden
France 11–6 Finland
Switzerland 10–3 Germany
Norway 8–6 Italy
Women, draw 3:
Finland 3–8 Norway
England 7–11 Denmark
Sweden 7–6 Switzerland
Italy 5–11 Russia
Scotland 5–2 Germany
Standings: Russia 3 wins, Denmark, Scotland, Sweden, Switzerland, Norway 2, Italy, Germany 1, England, Finland 0.
Men, draw 4:
Denmark 6–7 France
Norway 10–2 Germany
Italy 6–7 Czech Republic
Scotland 15–1 Finland
Sweden 6–5 Switzerland
Standings: Norway 4 wins, France, Scotland, Sweden 3, Czech Republic, Finland, Switzerland 2, Germany 1, Denmark, Italy 0.

Field hockey
Men's Champions Trophy in Melbourne, Australia:
Fifth place match:  2–5 
Third place match:  2–4  
Final:   5–3  
The Kookaburras rallied from a 3–1 half-time deficit to win the Trophy for a record 10th time.

Figure skating
ISU Grand Prix:
Grand Prix Final in Tokyo, Japan:
Junior Ice Dance:  Ksenia Monko/Kirill Khaliavin  141.21  Elena Ilinykh/Nikita Katsalapov  139.36  Maia Shibutani/Alex Shibutani  138.75
Junior Ladies:  Kanako Murakami  160.53  Polina Shelepen  159.29  Christina Gao  151.47

Football (soccer)
 Campeonato Brasileiro Série A: (teams in bold qualify for 2010 Copa Libertadores)
Final standings: Flamengo 67 points, Internacional, São Paulo 65, Cruzeiro, Palmeiras 62.
Flamengo win their sixth national championship and the first since 1992.
 K-League Championship Final, second leg: (first leg score in parentheses)
Jeonbuk Hyundai Motors 3–1 (0–0) Seongnam Ilhwa Chunma. Jeonbuk Hyundai Motors win 3–1 on aggregate.
Joenbuk win their first ever championship.

Golf
Off-season men's events:
Chevron World Challenge in Thousand Oaks, California
Winner: Jim Furyk

Handball
World Women's Championship in China:
Group A:
 23–36 
 23–26 
 24–16 
Group B:
 10–45 
 20–28 
 8–45 
Group C:
 14–48 
 25–36 
 28–37 
Group D:
 26–35 
 15–33 
 13–25

Luge
World Cup in Altenberg, Germany:
Women:  Tatjana Hüfner  1:47.555  Natalie Geisenberger  1:47.744  Anke Wischnewski  1:47.994
World Cup standings (after three of eight events): (1) Hüfner 285 points (2) Geisenberger 270 (3) Wischnewski 210
Teams:  Germany (Felix Loch, Tatjana Hüfner, Tobias Wendl/Tobias Arlt) 2:25.742  United States (Tony Benshoof, Erin Hamlin, Christian Niccum/Dan Joye) 2:26.680  Canada (Samuel Edney, Alex Gough, Chris Moffat/Mike Moffat) 2:26.941
World Cup standings (after two of five events): (1) Canada 170 points (2) United States 145 (3) Austria 140

Nordic combined
World Cup in Lillehammer, Norway:
HS138 / 10 km:  Tino Edelmann   Anssi Koivuranta   Jason Lamy Chappuis 
Standings after 4 of 19 events: (1) Lamy Chappuis 305 points (2) Edelmann 254 (3) Eric Frenzel  225

Ski jumping
World Cup in Lillehammer, Norway:
HS 138:  Simon Ammann  277.1 points (146.0 (hill record)/129.5 meters)  Harri Olli  267.6 (142.0/126.0)  Emmanuel Chedal  265.0 (138.5/127.5)
Overall World Cup standings (after 3 of 24 events): (1) Gregor Schlierenzauer  162 pts (2) Ammann 144 (3) Pascal Bodmer  143

Snooker
Pukka Pies UK Championship in Telford, England:
Round of 32:
Mark Selby  (7) def. Jamie Cope  9–8
Liang Wenbo  def. Ryan Day  (8) 9–3
Neil Robertson  (9) def. Tom Ford 9–3
Stuart Bingham  def. Joe Perry  (12) 9–4
John Higgins  (2) def. Ricky Walden  9–7
Stephen Hendry  (10) def. Steve Davis  9–6
Stephen Lee  def. Mark Allen  (11) 9–8
Peter Ebdon  (14) def. Judd Trump  9–4

Snowboarding
World Cup in Limone Piemonte, Italy:
Men's parallel slalom: Cancelled
Women's parallel slalom: Cancelled

Speed skating
World Cup 4 in Calgary, Canada:
1000 m women:  Christine Nesbitt  1:14.03  Annette Gerritsen  1:14.48  Monique Angermüller  1:14.68
1000 m men:  Shani Davis  1:06.91  Lee Kyou-hyuk  1:07.61  Denny Morrison  1:07.77
Team pursuit women:  Canada (Kristina Groves, Christine Nesbitt, Brittany Schussler) 2:55.79  Japan (Masako Hozumi, Maki Tabata, Shiho Ishizawa) 2:59.79  Germany (Isabell Ost, Stephanie Beckert, Katrin Mattscherodt) 3:00.25
Team pursuit men:  Netherlands (Sven Kramer, Carl Verheijen, Jan Blokhuijsen) 3:38.05  Canada (Denny Morrison, Lucas Makowsky, Mathieu Giroux) 3:39.17  Norway (Håvard Bøkko, Sverre Lunde Pedersen, Fredrik van der Horst) 3:41.59

Tennis
Davis Cup Final in Barcelona, day 3:
 5–0 
Rafael Nadal  def. Jan Hájek  6–3, 6–4
David Ferrer  def. Lukáš Dlouhý  6–4, 6–2

December 5, 2009 (Saturday)

Alpine skiing
Men's World Cup in Beaver Creek, United States:
Downhill:  Carlo Janka  1:43.49  Didier Cuche  1:43.51  Aksel Lund Svindal  1:43.53
Overall standings (after 6 of 34 races): (1) Janka 360 points (2) Cuche 319 (3) Benjamin Raich  201
Women's World Cup in Lake Louise, Canada:
Downhill:  Lindsey Vonn  1:50.06  Maria Riesch  1:50.41  Emily Brydon  1:50.76
Overall standings (after 6 of 33 races): (1) Riesch 316 points (2) Vonn 309 (3) Kathrin Zettel  220

American football
NCAA Division I FBS (unbeaten teams in bold):
Conference championship games (BCS rankings in parentheses):
SEC Championship Game in Atlanta: (2) Alabama 32, (1) Florida 13
The Crimson Tide book a spot in the National Championship Game, with Mark Ingram II running for three touchdowns. Florida's consolation prize is likely to be the Sugar Bowl.
Big 12 Championship Game in Arlington, Texas: (3) Texas 13, (22) Nebraska 12
Hunter Lawrence's 46-yard field goal with :01 left in the game seals the Big 12 title for the Longhorns, and will likely earn them a berth in the National Championship Game.
ACC Championship Game in Tampa, Florida: (10) Georgia Tech 39, Clemson 34
Jonathan Dwyer's 15-yard touchdown run with 1:20 left gives the Yellow Jackets their first outright conference title since 1990 and a trip to the Orange Bowl.
Conference USA Championship in Greenville, North Carolina: East Carolina 38, (21) Houston 32
Other BCS Top 10 games:
(5) Cincinnati 45, (15) Pittsburgh 44
After the Panthers score a touchdown with 1:36 left for a 44–38 lead, the snap is bobbled on the extra point attempt, allowing Tony Pike to lead a 4-play 61-yard drive capped by a 29-yard touchdown pass to Armon Binns. With the win, the Bearcats earn the Big East automatic BCS bowl berth.
(6) Boise State 42, New Mexico State 7
The Broncos complete their second consecutive unbeaten regular season and third in the last four years, but are not assured of a BCS bowl berth, because TCU is higher in the BCS rankings, and only one "non-BCS conferences" champion can earn an automatic BCS bowl berth.
Played earlier this week: (7) Oregon
Regular season completed: (4) TCU, (8) Ohio State, (9) Iowa
Other games:
Arizona 21, (18) USC 17
Washington 42, (19) California 10
NCAA Division I FCS:
Playoffs, quarterfinals (unbeaten team in bold; seeds in parentheses):
(1) Montana 51, Stephen F. Austin 0
Appalachian State 35, (4) Richmond 31
(2) Villanova 46, New Hampshire 7
William & Mary 24, (3) Southern Illinois 3
Other games:
Gridiron Classic in Indianapolis: Butler 28, Central Connecticut State 23

Biathlon
World Cup 1 in Östersund, Sweden:
Women's 7.5 km sprint:  Tora Berger  21:21.5 (0 penalties)  Olga Medvedtseva  21:28.3 (0)  Kaisa Mäkäräinen  21:31.5 (0)
Overall World Cup standings (after two of 25 events): (1) Helena Jonsson  103 points (2) Berger 87 (3) Anna Carin Olofsson-Zidek  & Medvedtseva 86
Men's 10 km sprint:  Ole Einar Bjørndalen  23:30.1 (0 penalties)  Emil Hegle Svendsen  23:55.2 (1)  Tim Burke  24:07.3 (0)
Overall World Cup standings (after two of 25 events): (1) Svendsen 114 points (2) Burke 102 (3) Christoph Sumann  84

Bobsleigh
World Cup in Cesana, Italy:
Two-man:  Beat Hefti/Thomas Lamparter  1:52.37  Ivo Rüegg/Cedric Grand  1:52.59  Steven Holcomb/Curtis Tomasevicz  1:52.87
Standings (after 3 of 8 races): (1) Rüegg 610 points (2) Holcomb 602 (3) Alexandr Zubkov  552
Two-woman:  Shauna Rohbock/Michelle Rzepka  1:56.09  Cathleen Martini/Romy Logsch  1:56.43  Sandra Kiriasis/Berit Wiacker  1:56.45
Standings (after 3 of 8 races): (1) Martini 660 points (2) Kiriasis 620 (3) Rohbock 561

Cricket
Sri Lanka in India:
3rd Test in Mumbai, day 4:
 393 & 274/6 (93.0 ov, Kumar Sangakkara 133*);  726/9d. Sri Lanka trail by 59 runs with 4 wickets remaining.
Pakistan in New Zealand:
2nd Test in Wellington, day 3:
 264 & 239;  99 & 70/3 (33.0 ov). New Zealand require another 335 runs with 7 wickets remaining.
West Indies in Australia:
2nd Test in Adelaide, day 2:
 451;  174/0 (48.0 ov). Australia trail by 277 runs with 10 wickets remaining in the 1st innings.
ICC Intercontinental Shield:
 v  in Windhoek, day 1:
Namibia 255/5 (96.0 ov)

Cross-country skiing
World Cup in Düsseldorf, Germany:
Women's sprint freestyle:  Hanna Falk   Natalia Korosteleva   Vesna Fabjan 
Men's sprint freestyle:  Alexey Petukhov   Anders Gløersen   Eirik Brandsdal

Curling
European Championships in Aberdeen, Scotland: (unbeaten teams in bold)
Men, draw 1:
Germany 8–5 Denmark (9 ends)
Italy 5–6 France
Norway 8–7 Switzerland (11 ends)
Sweden 2–3 Scotland
Finland 9–8 Czech Republic (11 ends)
Women, draw 1:
Russia 8–5 England
Germany 7–4 Sweden (9 ends)
Scotland 6–11 Italy (9 ends)
Denmark 9–4 Finland (9 ends)
Switzerland 6–4 Norway (9 ends)
Men, draw 2:
Finland 9–7 Italy
Switzerland 9–6 Czech Republic
Germany 4–10 Sweden (8 ends)
Norway 8–5 Denmark (9 ends)
France 2–5 Scotland
Women, draw 2:
Switzerland 10–2 Germany (7 ends)
Italy 6–7 Norway (11 ends)
Russia 10–1 Denmark (6 ends)
Scotland 7–4 England (9 ends)
Sweden 9–2 Finland (8 ends)

Field hockey
Men's Champions Trophy in Melbourne, Australia: (teams in bold advance to the final)
 3–2 
 10–3 
 4–3 
Final standings: Australia 12 points, Germany, Netherlands 9, Korea 7, England 4, Spain 2.

Figure skating
ISU Grand Prix:
Grand Prix Final in Tokyo, Japan:
Junior Ice Dance – Original Dance: (1) Ksenia Monko/Kirill Khaliavin  55.70 (2) Maia Shibutani/Alex Shibutani  55.21 (3) Elena Ilinykh/Nikita Katsalapov  54.35
Junior Ladies – Short Program: (1) Polina Shelepen  59.54 (2) Kanako Murakami  59.52 (3) Ksenia Makarova  55.38
Senior Pairs:  Shen Xue/Zhao Hongbo  214.25 (WR)  Pang Qing/Tong Jian  201.86  Aliona Savchenko/Robin Szolkowy  200.38
Shen/Zhao win the title for the sixth time and set world records for both Free Skating (138.89) and Total, to add to the world best mark in Short Program they set on Thursday.
Senior Men:  Evan Lysacek  249.45  Nobunari Oda  243.36  Johnny Weir  237.35
Senior Ladies:  Kim Yuna  188.86  Miki Ando  185.94  Akiko Suzuki  174.00

Football (soccer)
CECAFA Cup in Kenya: (teams in bold advance to the quarterfinals)
Group B:
 3–1 
 0–1 
Final standings: Rwanda 9 points, Eritrea, Zimbabwe 4, Somalia 0.
CAF Confederation Cup Finals, second leg: (first leg score in parentheses)
Stade Malien  2–0 (0–2)  ES Sétif. 2–2 on aggregate, Stade Malien win 3–2 in penalty shootout.
OFC Champions League Group stage, Matchday 3:
Group B: PRK Hekari United  2–1  Marist FC
Standings: Tafea FC 7 points, Lautoka F.C. 6, Hekari United 4, Marist 0.
 J.League:
Final standings: Kashima Antlers 66 points, Kawasaki Frontale 64, Gamba Osaka 60. Top three teams qualify for AFC Champions League Group stage.
 Ecuadorian Championship playoff, second leg: (first leg score in parentheses)
Deportivo Quito 3–2 (1–1) Deportivo Cuenca. Deportivo Quito win 4–3 on aggregate.
Deportivo win the title for the second straight year and fourth time overall.
 Primera División Chilena Clausura playoff final, first leg:
Colo-Colo 2–2 Universidad Católica

Handball
World Women's Championship in China:
Group A:
 20–22 
 28–19 
 26–27 
Group B:
 39–9 
 52–11 
 27–18 
Group C:
 51–17 
 34–19 
 33–25 
Group D:
 39–21 
 29–18 
 26–15

Luge
World Cup in Altenberg, Germany:
Men:  Felix Loch  1:48.911  Armin Zoggeler  1:48.969  Albert Demtschenko  1:49.049
World Cup standings (after three of eight events): (1) Zöggeler 285 points (2) Loch 220 (3) David Möller  191
Doubles:  André Florschütz/Torsten Wustlich  1:24.460  Peter Penz/Georg Fischler  1:24.479  Christian Oberstolz/Patrick Gruber  1:24.565
World Cup standings (after three of eight events): (1) Florschütz/Wustlich 270 points (2) Patric Leitner/Alexander Resch  250 (3) Oberstolz/Gruber 200

Nordic combined
World Cup in Lillehammer, Norway:
HS138 / 10 km:  Jason Lamy Chappuis   Petter Tande   Eric Frenzel 
Standings after 3 of 19 events: (1) Lamy Chappuis 245 points (2) Hannu Manninen , Tande & Frenzel 180

Rugby union
End of year tests:
Week 6:
Barbarians 25–18  in London
IRB Sevens World Series:
Dubai Sevens in Dubai:
Cup Final:  24–12

Speed skating
World Cup 4 in Calgary, Canada:
500 m women:  Jenny Wolf  37.21  Wang Beixing  37.60  Lee Sang-hwa  37.64
500 m men:  Lee Kyou-hyuk  34.28  Mika Poutala  34.38  Tucker Fredricks  34.50
1500 m women:  Kristina Groves  1:54.35  Christine Nesbitt  1:54.43  Elma de Vries  1:54.55
5000 m men:  Sven Kramer  6:11.11  Ivan Skobrev  1:54.43  Bob de Jong  6:13.80

Ski jumping
World Cup in Lillehammer, Norway:
HS 138:  Gregor Schlierenzauer  268.9 pts (125.5/141.0 metres)  Thomas Morgenstern  265.4 (130.0/134.0)  Adam Małysz  259.8 (127.5/134.5)
Overall World Cup standings (after two of 24 events): (1) Bjørn Einar Romøren  114 pts (2) Schlierenzauer 112 (3) Pascal Bodmer  98

Snooker
Pukka Pies UK Championship in Telford, England:
Round of 32:
Shaun Murphy  (1) def. Gerard Greene  9–5
Stephen Maguire  (4) def. Michael Holt  9–6
Mark Williams  (15) def. Graeme Dott  9–2
Anthony Hamilton  (16) def. Mark King  9–2

Tennis
Davis Cup Final in Barcelona, day 2:
 3–0 
Feliciano López/Fernando Verdasco def. Tomáš Berdych/Radek Štěpánek 7–6, 7–5, 6–2
Spain win the Cup for the fourth time and becomes the first nation to successfully defend the title since 1998.

December 4, 2009 (Friday)

Alpine skiing
Men's World Cup in Beaver Creek, United States:
Super combined:  Carlo Janka  2:32.26  Didier Defago  2:32.69  Natko Zrnčić-Dim  2:32.75
Overall standings (after 5 of 34 races): (1) Janka 260 points (2) Didier Cuche  239 (3) Benjamin Raich  201
Women's World Cup in Lake Louise, Canada:
Downhill:  Lindsey Vonn  1:26.13  Emily Brydon  1:26.65  Maria Riesch  1:26.93
Overall standings (after 5 of 33 races): (1) Riesch 236 points (2) Kathrin Zettel  220 (3) Vonn 209

American football
NCAA Division I FBS:
MAC Championship Game in Detroit:
Central Michigan 20, Ohio 10
 The Chippewas win the MAC crown for the third time in four years, with quarterback Dan LeFevour passing for two touchdowns to set a new FBS record for combined TDs passing, running, and receiving in a career with 148, surpassing the previous record of Colt Brennan of Hawaii and Graham Harrell of Texas Tech.

Basketball
NBA:
The New Jersey Nets end their 18-game losing streak from the start of the season with a 97–91 win over the Charlotte Bobcats, in the first game of general manager Kiki Vandeweghe as head coach.

Cricket
Sri Lanka in India:
3rd Test in Mumbai, day 3:
 393 & 11/0 (3.0 ov);  726/9d (Virender Sehwag 293, MS Dhoni 100*). Sri Lanka trail by 322 runs with 10 wickets remaining.
Pakistan in New Zealand:
2nd Test in Wellington, day 2:
 264 & 64/2 (23.0 ov);  99. Pakistan led by 229 runs with 8 wickets remaining.
West Indies in Australia:
2nd Test in Adelaide, day 1:
 336/6 (85.0 ov, Dwayne Bravo 104)
England in South Africa:
5th ODI in Durban:
Match abandoned without a ball bowled. England win the 5-match series 2–1.

Figure skating
ISU Grand Prix:
Grand Prix Final in Tokyo, Japan:
Junior Men:  Yuzuru Hanyu  206.77  Song Nan  204.99  Ross Miner  196.09
Junior Pairs:  Sui Wenjing/Han Cong  160.45  Narumi Takahashi/Mervin Tran  145.80  Zhang Yue/Wang Lei 137.19
Senior Men – Short Program: (1) Daisuke Takahashi  89.95 (2) Evan Lysacek  89.85 (3) Nobunari Oda  87.65
Senior Ladies – Short Program: (1) Miki Ando  66.20 (2) Kim Yuna  65.64 (3) Alena Leonova  61.60
Senior Ice Dance:  Meryl Davis/Charlie White  169.44  Tessa Virtue/Scott Moir  168.22  Nathalie Péchalat/Fabian Bourzat  147.62

Football (soccer)
2010 FIFA World Cup Draw in Cape Town:
Group A:    
South Africa will play against Mexico in the opening match in Johannesburg on June 11.
Group B:    
Group C:    
Group D:    
Group E:    
Group F:    
Group G:    
Group H:    
CECAFA Cup in Kenya: (teams in bold advance to the quarterfinals)
Group A:
 6–0 
 2–0 
Standings: Zambia 9 points, Kenya 6, Ethiopia 3, Djibouti 0.
Group C:
 0–1 
 0–0 
Standings: Uganda 7 points, Tanzania 6, Zanzibar 4, Burundi 0.

Skeleton
World Cup in Cesana, Italy:
Men:  Jon Montgomery  1:55.54  Martins Dukurs  1:56.01  Jeff Pain  1:56.05
Standings after 3 of 8 races: (1) Dukurs 635 points (2) Sandro Stielicke  604 (3) Frank Rommel  601
Women:  Shelley Rudman  2:04.72  Marion Trott  1:57.81  Mellisa Hollingsworth  1:58.13
Standings after 3 of 8 races: (1) Rudman 627 points (2) Hollingsworth 625 points (3) Amy Gough  554

Speed skating
World Cup 4 in Calgary, Canada:
500 m women:  Jenny Wolf  37.33  Wang Beixing  37.34  Lee Sang-hwa  37.34
500 m men:  Mika Poutala  34.38  Joji Kato  34.45  Jamie Gregg  34.45
3000 m women:  Stephanie Beckert  3:56.80  Martina Sáblíková  3:56.83  Daniela Anschütz-Thoms  3:58.07
1500 m men:  Chad Hedrick  1:42.14  Shani Davis  1:42.19  Denny Morrison  1:42.74

Tennis
Davis Cup Final in Barcelona, day 1:
 2–0 
Rafael Nadal  def. Tomáš Berdych  7–5, 6–0, 6–2
David Ferrer  def. Radek Štěpánek  1–6, 2–6, 6–4, 6–4, 8–6

December 3, 2009 (Thursday)

American football
NFL Week 13:
Bills Toronto Series: New York Jets 19, Buffalo Bills 13
NCAA Division I FBS BCS Top 10:
The Civil War:  (7) Oregon 37, (16) Oregon State 33
The Civil War game decides the Pac-10 Champion for the first time ever as Oregon clinches its first trip to the Rose Bowl Game in 15 years. The game also sees Oregon running back LeGarrette Blount return from a suspension after punching a Boise State player immediately after the Ducks' first game.
Division I FCS news:
Hofstra University votes to close its football program after this season, citing large monetary losses. The school becomes the second in the Colonial Athletic Association to drop the sport in the last two weeks, following Northeastern. Current scholarship holders can keep their scholarships; those who seek to transfer to other schools may do so with the transfer waiting period waived. (ESPN)

Basketball
Euroleague Regular Season Game 6: (teams in bold advance to the Top-16 round)
Group A:
Montepaschi Siena  90–64  Cibona Zagreb
Regal FC Barcelona  89–55  Fenerbahçe Ülker İstanbul
ASVEL Villeurbanne  77–67  Žalgiris Kaunas
Standings: Barcelona 6–0, Siena 5–1, Fenerbahçe Ülker 3–3, Villeurbanne 2–4, Cibona, Žalgiris 1–5.
Group B:
Efes Pilsen Istanbul  77–62  Lietuvos Rytas Vilnius
Standings: Unicaja 5–1, Olympiacos 4–2, Efes Pilsen, Lietuvos Rytas, Partizan 3–3,  Orléans 0–6.
Group C:
Union Olimpija Ljubljana  65–82  Maccabi Tel Aviv
Standings: Maccabi 5–1, CSKA Moscow, Caja Laboral 4–2, Roma 3–3, Maroussi, Olimpija 1–5.
Group D:
EWE Baskets Oldenburg  80–82  Asseco Prokom Gdynia
Panathinaikos Athens  80–68  Armani Jeans Milano
Standings: Real Madrid, Panathinaikos 5–1, Khimki 4–2, Asseco Prokom 2–4, Milano, EWE Baskets 1–5.

Biathlon
World Cup 1 in Östersund, Sweden:
Men's 20 km Individual:  Emil Hegle Svendsen  52:43.7 (1 penalty)  Tim Burke  at 53:19.2 (1)  Christoph Sumann  53:33.2 (1)

Cricket
Sri Lanka in India:
3rd Test in Mumbai, day 2:
 393;  443/1 (79.0 ov, Virender Sehwag 284*). India led by 50 runs with 9 wickets remaining in the 1st innings.
Sehwag's score is the highest in one day of a Test match in 76 years and third highest ever. He also becomes the eighth player in history who scores six Test double-centuries, and reaches the 200 mark in 168 balls, the second fastest ever.
Pakistan in New Zealand:
2nd Test in Wellington, day 1:
 161/6 (58.0 ov)

Field hockey
Men's Champions Trophy in Melbourne, Australia:
 5–5 
 2–3 
 3–1 
Standings: Australia, Germany 9 points, Korea 7, Netherlands 6, Spain 2, England 1.

Figure skating
ISU Grand Prix:
Grand Prix Final in Tokyo, Japan:
Junior Pairs – Short Program: (1) Sui Wenjing/Han Cong  56.80 (2) Narumi Takahashi/Mervin Tran  54.44 (3) Ksenia Stolbova/Fedor Klimov  48.90
Junior Men – Short Program: (1) Song Nan  71.70 (2) Ross Miner  70.85 (3) Yuzuru Hanyu  69.85
Senior Pairs – Short Program: (1) Shen Xue/Zhao Hongbo  75.36 (WR) (2) Aliona Savchenko/Robin Szolkowy  73.14 (3) Maria Mukhortova/Maxim Trankov  69.78
Shen/Zhao better their own record by exactly 1 point.
Senior Ice Dance – Original Dance: (1) Meryl Davis/Charlie White  65.80 (2) Tessa Virtue/Scott Moir  64.01 (3) Nathalie Péchalat/Fabian Bourzat  56.93

Football (soccer)
CECAFA Cup in Kenya: (teams in bold advance to the quarterfinals)
Group B:
 1–2 
 0–2 
Standings: Rwanda 6 points, Zimbabwe 4, Eritrea 1, Somalia 0.
UEFA Europa League group stage, Matchday 5: (teams in bold advance to the round of 32, teams in strike are eliminated)
Group D:
Ventspils  0–1  Hertha BSC
Sporting CP  1–1  Heerenveen
Standings: Sporting CP 11 points, Hertha BSC 7, Heerenveen 5, Ventspils 3.
Group E:
Fulham  1–0  CSKA Sofia
Roma  2–1  Basel
Standings: Roma 10 points, Basel 9, Fulham 8, CSKA Sofia 1.
Group F:
Galatasaray  1–0  Panathinaikos
Dinamo București  2–1  Sturm Graz
Standings: Galatasaray 13 points, Panathinaikos 9, Dinamo București 6, Sturm Graz 1.
Group J:
Shakhtar Donetsk  0–0  Club Brugge
Toulouse  1–0  Partizan
Standings: Shakhtar Donetsk 13 points, Club Brugge 8, Toulouse 7, Partizan 0.
Group K:
PSV Eindhoven  1–0  Sparta Prague
Copenhagen  2–0  CFR Cluj
Standings: PSV Eindhoven 11 points, Copenhagen, Sparta Prague 7, CFR Cluj 3.
Group L:
Austria Wien  0–3  Athletic Bilbao
Werder Bremen  4–1  Nacional
Standings: Werder Bremen 13 points, Athletic Bilbao 10, Nacional, Austria Wien 2.

December 2, 2009 (Wednesday)

Basketball
Euroleague Regular Season Game 6:
Group B:
Entente Orléans Loiret  84–88  Olympiacos Piraeus
Unicaja Málaga  64–72  Partizan Belgrade
Standings: Unicaja 5–1, Olympiacos 4–2, Lietuvos Rytas 3–2, Partizan 3–3, Efes Pilsen, 2–3, Orléans 0–6.
Group C:
CSKA Moscow  78–65  Maroussi Athens
Caja Laboral Baskonia  67–60  Lottomatica Roma
Standings: Maccabi 4–1, CSKA Moscow, Caja Laboral 4–2, Roma 3–3, Olimpija 1–4, Maroussi 1–5.
Group D:
Real Madrid  70–59  Khimki Moscow Region
Standings: Real Madrid 5–1, Panathinaikos 4–1, Khimki 4–2, Milano, Asseco Prokom, EWE Baskets 1–4.
NBA:
The New Jersey Nets lose to the Dallas Mavericks 117–101 and set a record for the worst start of a season with 18 straight losses. General manager Kiki Vandeweghe is appointed as head coach and will take charge on December 4 against the Charlotte Bobcats.

Biathlon
World Cup 1 in Östersund, Sweden:
Women's 15 km Individual:  Helena Jonsson  43:01.4 (1 penalty)  Anna Carin Olofsson-Zidek  43:27.6 (2)  Darya Domracheva  44:17.8 (2)

Cricket
Sri Lanka in India:
3rd Test in Mumbai, day 1:
 366/8 (89.0 ov, Tillakaratne Dilshan 109)

Football (soccer)
CECAFA Cup in Kenya: (teams in bold advance to the quarterfinals)
Group A:
 1–0 
 2–0 
Standings: Zambia 6 points, Ethiopia, Kenya 3, Djibouti 0.
Group C:
 2–0 
Standings: Uganda 6 points, Zanzibar, Tanzania 3, Burundi 0.
UEFA Europa League group stage, Matchday 5: (teams in bold advance to the round of 32, teams in strike are eliminated)
Group A:
Timişoara  1–2  Ajax
Anderlecht  0–1  Dinamo Zagreb
Standings: Ajax 11 points, Anderlecht 8, Dinamo Zagreb 6, Timişoara 2.
Group B:
Valencia  3–1  Lille
Slavia Prague  0–0  Genoa
Standings: Valencia 9 points, Lille, Genoa 7, Slavia Prague 3.
Group C:
Celtic  2–0  Hapoel Tel Aviv
Hamburg  2–0  Rapid Wien
Standings: Hamburg 10 points, Hapoel Tel Aviv 9, Celtic 5, Rapid Wien 4.
Group G:
Red Bull Salzburg  2–1  Lazio
Levski Sofia  0–2  Villarreal
Standings: Red Bull Salzburg 15 points, Villarreal 9, Lazio 6, Levski Sofia 0.
Group H:
Sheriff Tiraspol  1–1  Steaua București
Twente  0–1  Fenerbahçe
Standings: Fenerbahçe 12 points, Twente 7, Sheriff Tiraspol 5, Steaua București 3.
Group I:
BATE Borisov  1–2  Benfica
AEK Athens  0–1  Everton
Standings: Benfica 12 points, Everton 9, BATE, AEK Athens 4.
Copa Sudamericana Finals, second leg: (first leg score in parentheses)
Fluminense  3–0 (1–5)  LDU Quito. LDU Quito win 5–4 on aggregate.
LDU win their third international trophy in the last 17 months, following the 2008 Copa Libertadores and 2009 Recopa Sudamericana.
 K-League Championship Final, first leg:
Seongnam Ilhwa Chunma 0–0 Jeonbuk Hyundai Motors

December 1, 2009 (Tuesday)

Field hockey
Men's Champions Trophy in Melbourne, Australia:
 4–5 
 1–2 
 2–1 
Standings: Australia 9 points, Germany, Korea 6, Netherlands 3, England, Spain 1.

Football (soccer)
CECAFA Cup in Kenya: (teams in bold advance to the quarterfinals)
Group B:
 0–0 
Group C:
 1–0

References

XII